= National road 96 (Poland) =

National road in Poland

National Road 96
- Droga krajowa nr 96
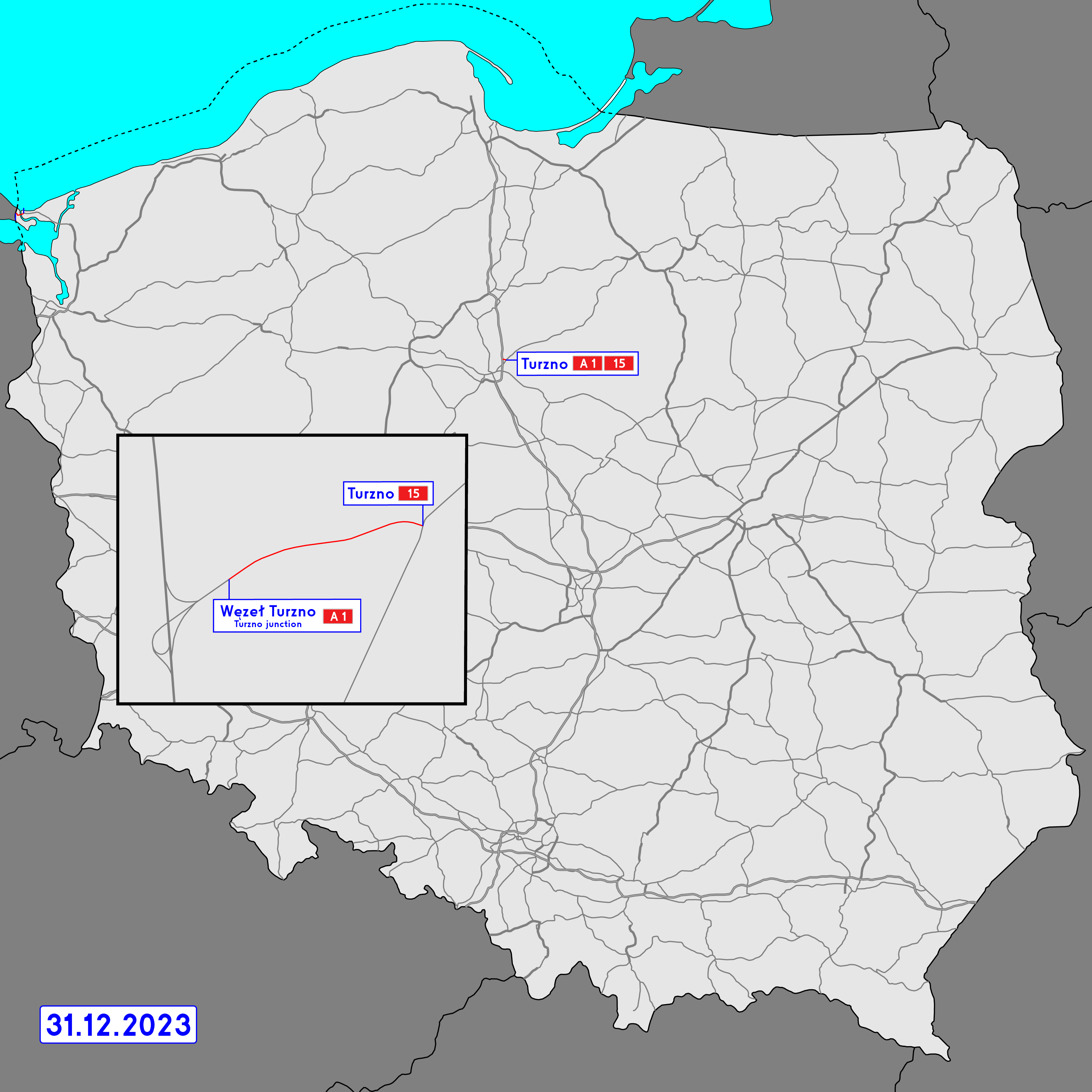

Route information
- Maintained by GDDKiA
- Length: 1.5 km (0.93 mi)

Major junctions
- From: A1, "Turzno" junction
- To: DK 15; Gronowo, Kuyavian-Pomeranian Voivodeship

Location
- Country: Poland
- Regions: Kuyavian-Pomeranian Voivodeship

Highway system
- National roads in Poland; Voivodeship roads
← DK 95	→ DK 97

National road 96 (Polish: Droga krajowa nr 96, abbreviated as DK96) is a main road of accelerated traffic (class GP road; Polish: droga główna ruchu przyspieszonego, droga klasy GP), belonging to Polish national roads network, with length of 1.5 kilometres (0.93 mi) and located in Toruń County (West Pomeranian Voivodeship). It connects motorway A1 (Turzno junction) with national road 15. With its length, the route is the shortest one of all national roads in Poland.^{A}

It was established by the Ordinance No. 60 of the General Director for National Roads and Motorways of December 20, 2013, that became valid on January 1, 2014.

The signage of national road 96 is placed only at the exit of Turzno toll plaza on the junction with motorway A1 and near the roundabout with national road 15 – the route number was not placed on the signpost boards.

From 1986 to 2000 the number 96 was assigned to Bielsko-Biała – Kęty – Wadowice – Głogoczów route, which currently is signed as road 52.

Because the route is a direct link to the motorway, vehicles other than motorcars (low-speed vehicles, bicycles, mopeds, horse-drawn, etc.) cannot use it.

== Permissible axle load ==
The entire route is designed for a single axle load of up to 11.5 tonnes (25,000 lb).

== Route plan ==
Country	Voivodeship	Location	km	mi	Exit	Name	Destinations	Notes
Poland	Kuyavian-Pomeranian Voivodeship	Gmina Lubicz	0	0.0	—	Turzno	A 1 / E75 – Gdańsk / Łódź	Trumpet junction equipped with toll station as part of Rusocin – Toruń toll section of the motorway
Poland	Kuyavian-Pomeranian Voivodeship	Gmina Lubicz			—	Viaduct	DW 646 – Turzno / Brzeźno^{B}	Passage under the viaduct of road 646 only
Poland	Kuyavian-Pomeranian Voivodeship	Gmina Lubicz	1.5	0.93	—	Roundabout	DK 15 – Olsztyn / Toruń	The roundabout is located near the village of Gronowo
1.000 mi = 1.609 km; 1.000 km = 0.621 mi: Tolled

== Notes ==
^A Until the end of 2013 the shortest national road in Poland was route 85 with its length of 4.774 kilometres (2.966 mi).
^B In the official list of voivodeship roads the village name is erroneously stated as Brzeżno.
