= National road 1 (Poland) =

Trunk highway in Poland

Coordinates: 52°46′14″N 18°52′46″E

National Road 1
- Droga krajowa nr 1
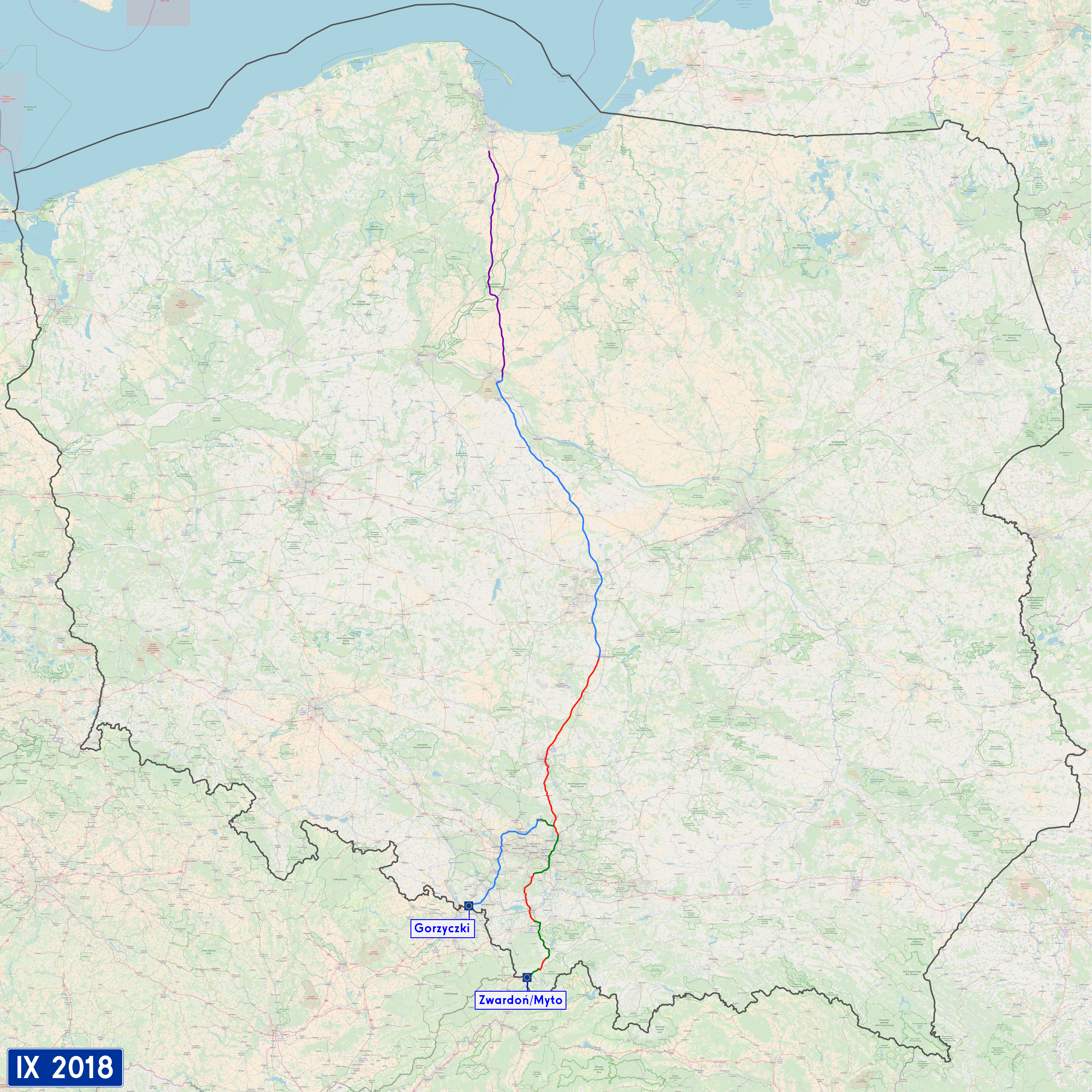
- Trunk road standard Expressway standard Autostrada A1

Route information
- Part of European route E75
- Maintained by GDDKiA
- Length: 640 km (400 mi)

Location
- Country: Poland
- Regions: Pomeranian Voivodeship; Kuyavian-Pomeranian Voivodeship; Łódź Voivodeship; Silesian Voivodeship
- Major cities: Gdańsk, Grudziądz, Toruń, Łódź, Częstochowa, Sosnowiec, Katowice, Bielsko-Biała

Highway system
- National roads in Poland; Voivodeship roads
← DK 98	→ DK 2

National road 1 (Polish: Droga krajowa nr 1, abbreviated as DK1) is a route in the Polish national road network, connecting northern and southern regions of Poland. It runs from Gdańsk on the Baltic Sea coast, through the center of the country, at its southern end at the Upper Silesian Industrial Area forking into two branches to the border with the Czech Republic at Gorzyczki and with Slovakia at Zwardoń. The route traverses the Pomeranian, Kuyavian-Pomeranian, Łódź and Silesian voivodeships. Most of the national road 1 is a part of the European route E75.

The entire route from Gdańsk to the Czech border has been gradually upgraded to motorway standards, forming the A1 motorway known as the Amber Highway. Key segments were opened between 2005 and 2016, and a final section was finished in 2023. Segments of the old route were reassigned as the national road 91.

The branch of the route from Pyrzowice near Katowice to Zwardoń is being upgraded to an expressway, marked S1. The reconstruction is scheduled to completed by 2024.

According to the Regulation of Minister of Infrastructure from February 9, 2023, the stretch of road between motorway junction Częstochowa Północ and the junction with national road 91 is again signed as national road 1.^{A} However, this spur is not considered the main course of the route.

== Major cities and towns along the route ==
- Gdańsk (national road 7)
- Toruń (national road 15, 80)
- Włocławek (national road 62)
- Krośniewice (national road 92)
- Zgierz (national road 71)
- Łódź (national road 14, 72)
- Piotrków Trybunalski (national road 8, 12, 91)
- Radomsko (national road 42)
- Częstochowa (national road 43, 46, 91)
- Siewierz (national road 78)
- Dąbrowa Górnicza (national road 94)
- Sosnowiec
- Mysłowice (national road 4)
- Tychy (national road 44, 86)
- Bielsko-Biała (national road 52)
- Zwardoń, border with Slovakia

== Notes ==
^A After opening the A1 motorway in 2020, the old route was deprived of signage of national road 1. The matter of signage was later a subject of dispute between Częstochowa city council and General Directorate for National Roads and Highways.
