= National road 4 (Poland) =

Road in Poland

Coordinates: 50°02′26″N 22°04′45″E

National Road 4
- Droga krajowa nr 4
- Toll motorway A4 Motorway A4

Route information
- Part of E40
- Maintained by GDDKiA
- Length: 669 km (416 mi)
- Existed: 2016–present

Major junctions
- West end: Jędrzychowice (PL-D border)
- East end: Korczowa (PL-UA border)

Location
- Country: Poland
- Regions: Lower Silesia Voivodeship; Opole Voivodeship; Silesian Voivodeship; Lesser Poland Voivodeship; Podkarpackie Voivodeship
- Major cities: Legnica, Wrocław, Opole, Gliwice, Katowice, Kraków, Tarnów, Rzeszów

Highway system
- National roads in Poland; Voivodeship roads
← DK 3	→ DK 5

National road 4 (Polish: Droga krajowa nr 4, abbreviated as DK4) is a route in the Polish national road network. The highway connects the southern regions of Poland. It runs from Jędrzychowice near Zgorzelec at the German border to Korczowa at the Ukrainian border, as the A4 motorway. National road 4 is a component of European highway E40.

The A4 motorway was completed in July 2016, therefore the entire former road 4 was renumbered as national route 94.

== Major cities and towns along the route ==
- Zgorzelec (road 30, 94)
- Legnica (road 3)
- Kostomłoty (road 5)
- Bielany Wrocławskie (road 5, 35)
- Opole
- Gliwice (motorway A1, 44, 78, 408)
- Katowice (road 81, 86)
- Mysłowice (expressway S1)
- Chrzanów (road 79)
- Kraków (road 7, 44, 94)
- Targowisko (road 75)
- Brzesko (road 75)
- Tarnów (road 73)
- Pilzno (road 73)
- Rzeszów (road 9, 19, road 97)
- Jarosław (road 94)
- Radymno (road 77)
- Korczowa, border with Ukraine
