= National road 5 (Poland) =

National road in Poland

Coordinates: 52°10′40″N 16°42′38″E

National Road 5
- Droga krajowa nr 5
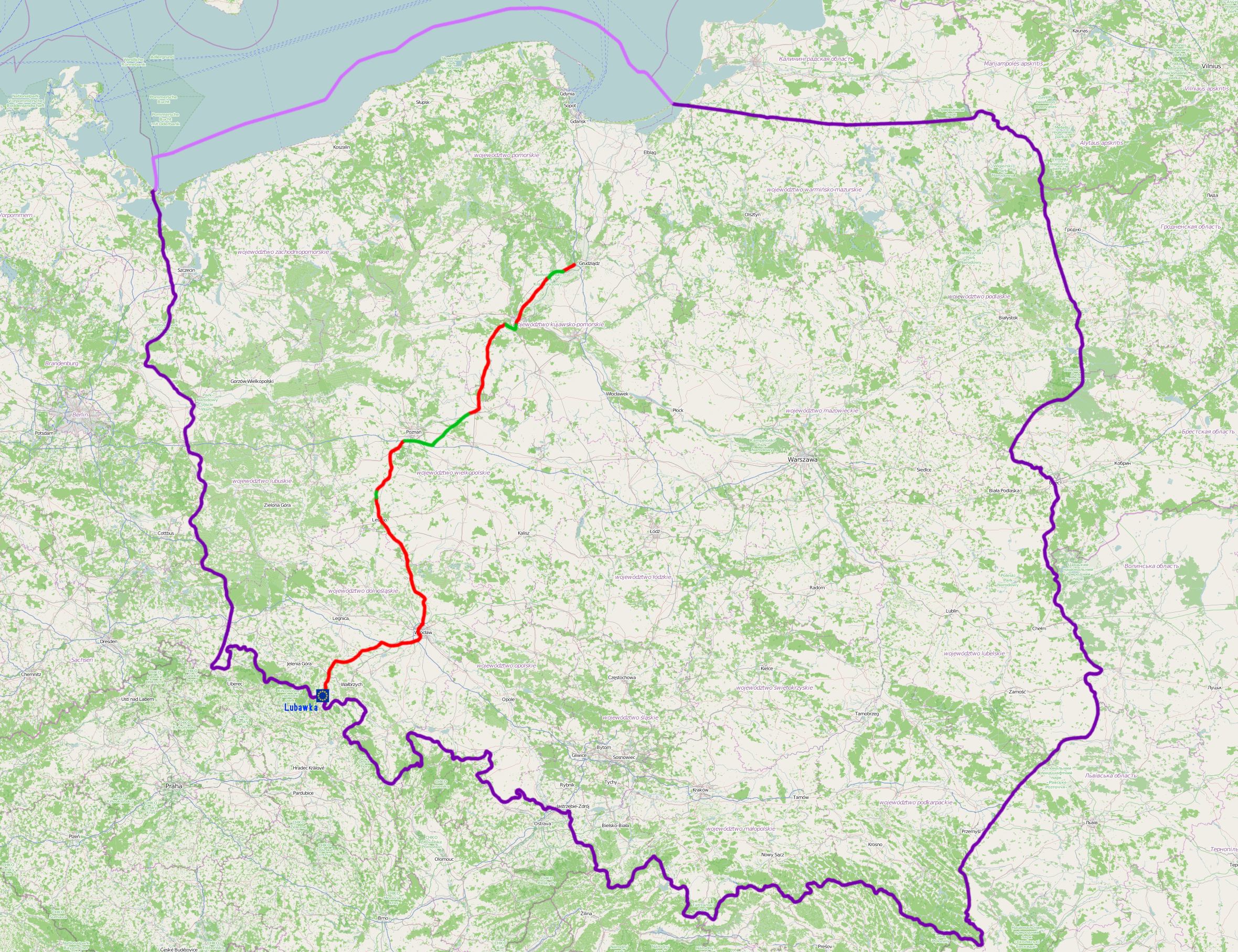
- Trunk road standard Expressway standard concurrency with motorways: 1. A2 near Poznań; 2. A4 near Wrocław

Route information
- Part of E261
- Maintained by GDDKiA
- Length: 496 km (308 mi)
- Existed: 1986–present

Major junctions
- North end: Nowe Marzy
- South end: Lubawka (PL-CZ border)

Location
- Country: Poland
- Regions: Kuyavian-Pomeranian Voivodeship; Greater Poland Voivodeship; Lower Silesian Voivodeship
- Major cities: Jelenia Góra, Wrocław, Leszno, Poznań, Bydgoszcz

Highway system
- National roads in Poland; Voivodeship roads
← DK 4	→ DK 6

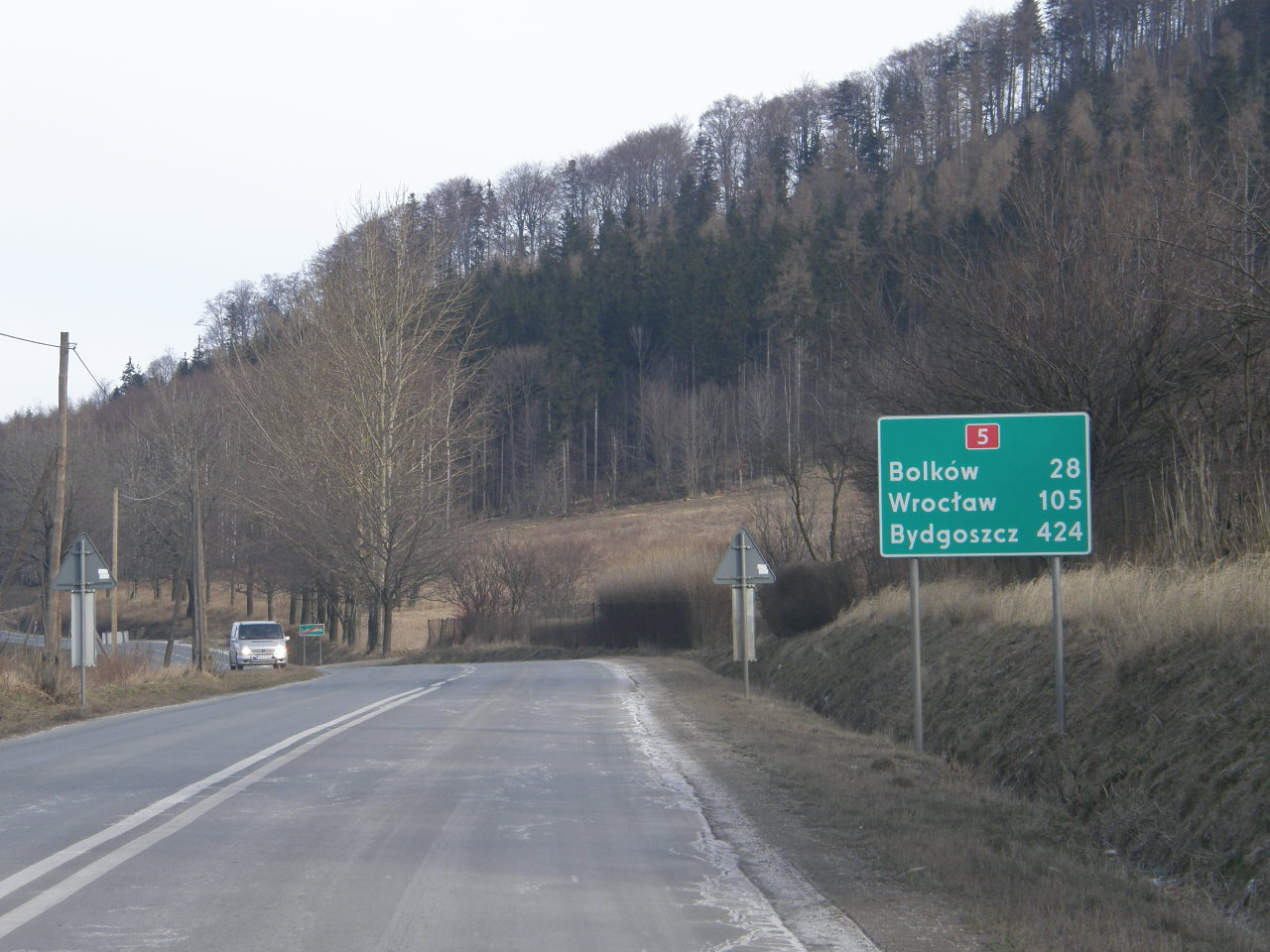
National road 5 in Lubawka

National road 5 (Polish: Droga krajowa nr 5) is a route belonging to the Polish national road network. The highway connects some of the biggest urban agglomerations in Poland, i.e. Trójmiasto, Bydgoszcz, Poznań and Wrocław. It runs from Nowe Marzy to Lubawka at the Czech border and between Bielany Wrocławskie and Kostomłoty merges with A4 motorway. On the segment from Nowe Marzy to Wrocław, it is a component of European route E261.

== Expressway S5 ==
The Nowe Marzy–Wrocław Północ section has expressway status as Expressway S5.

== Major cities and towns along the route ==
- Nowe Marzy (road A1, 91)
- Świecie (road 91)
- Bydgoszcz (road 10, 25, 80)
- Szubin
- Żnin
- Gniezno (road 15)
- Pobiedziska
- Poznań (road A2, 11, 92)
- Stęszew (road 32)
- Kościan
- Śmigiel
- Leszno (road 12)
- Rydzyna
- Bojanowo
- Rawicz (road 36)
- Żmigród
- Trzebnica (road 15)
- Wrocław (road A8, 94, 98)
- Bielany Wrocławskie (road A4, 98)
- Kąty Wrocławskie
- Strzegom
- Bolków (road 3)
- Kamienna Góra
- Lubawka, border with Czech Republic
