= National road 3 (Poland) =

National road in Poland

Coordinates: 52°25′16″N 15°33′09″E

National Road 3
- Droga krajowa nr 3
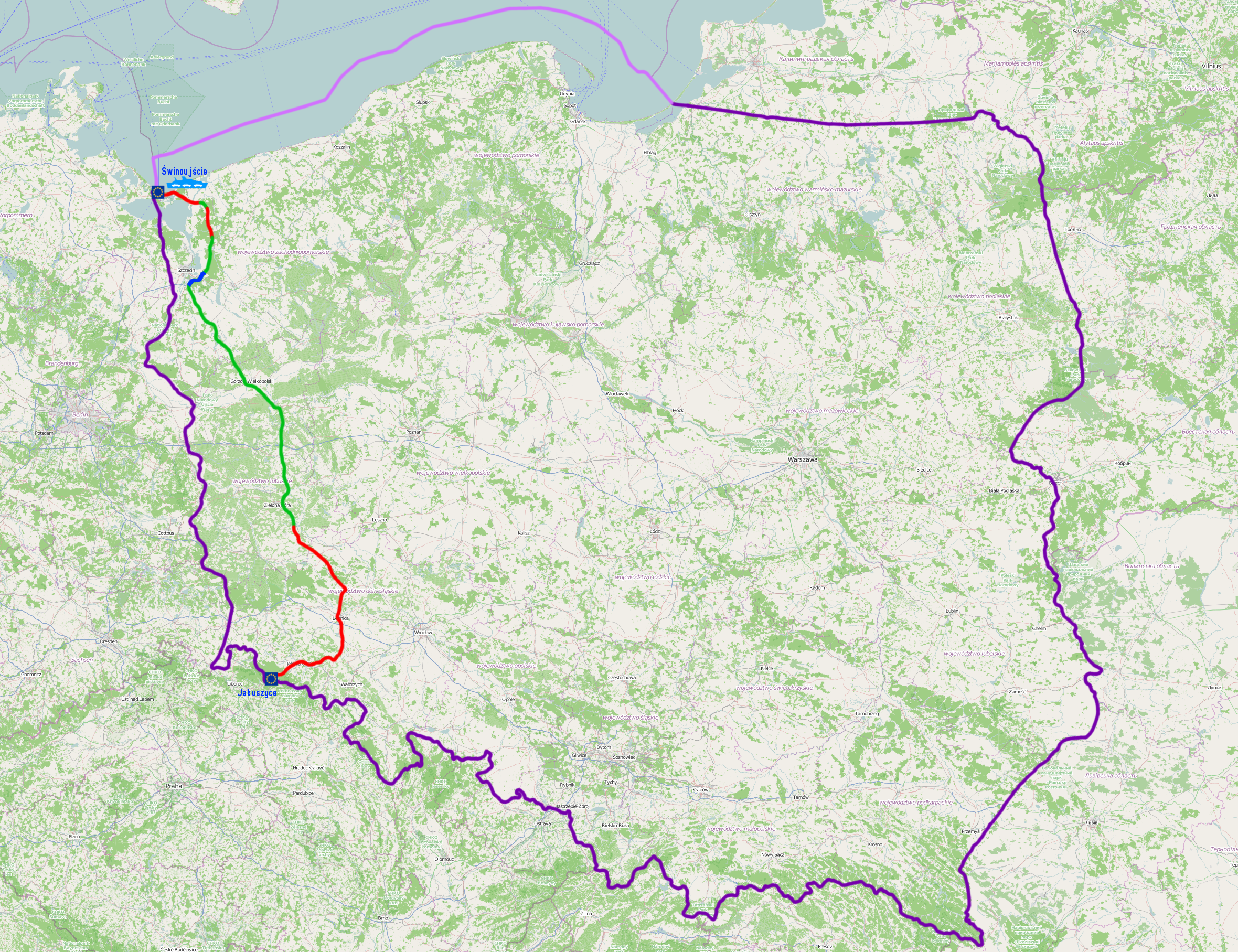

Route information
- Part of E65
- Maintained by GDDKiA
- Length: 504 km (313 mi)
- Existed: 1986–present

Major junctions
- north end: Świnoujście at the German border
- south end: Jakuszyce at the Czech border

Location
- Country: Poland
- Regions: West Pomeranian Voivodeship; Lubusz Voivodeship; Lower Silesian Voivodeship
- Major cities: Szczecin, Gorzów Wielkopolski, Zielona Góra, Legnica

Highway system
- National roads in Poland; Voivodeship roads
← DK 2	→ DK 4

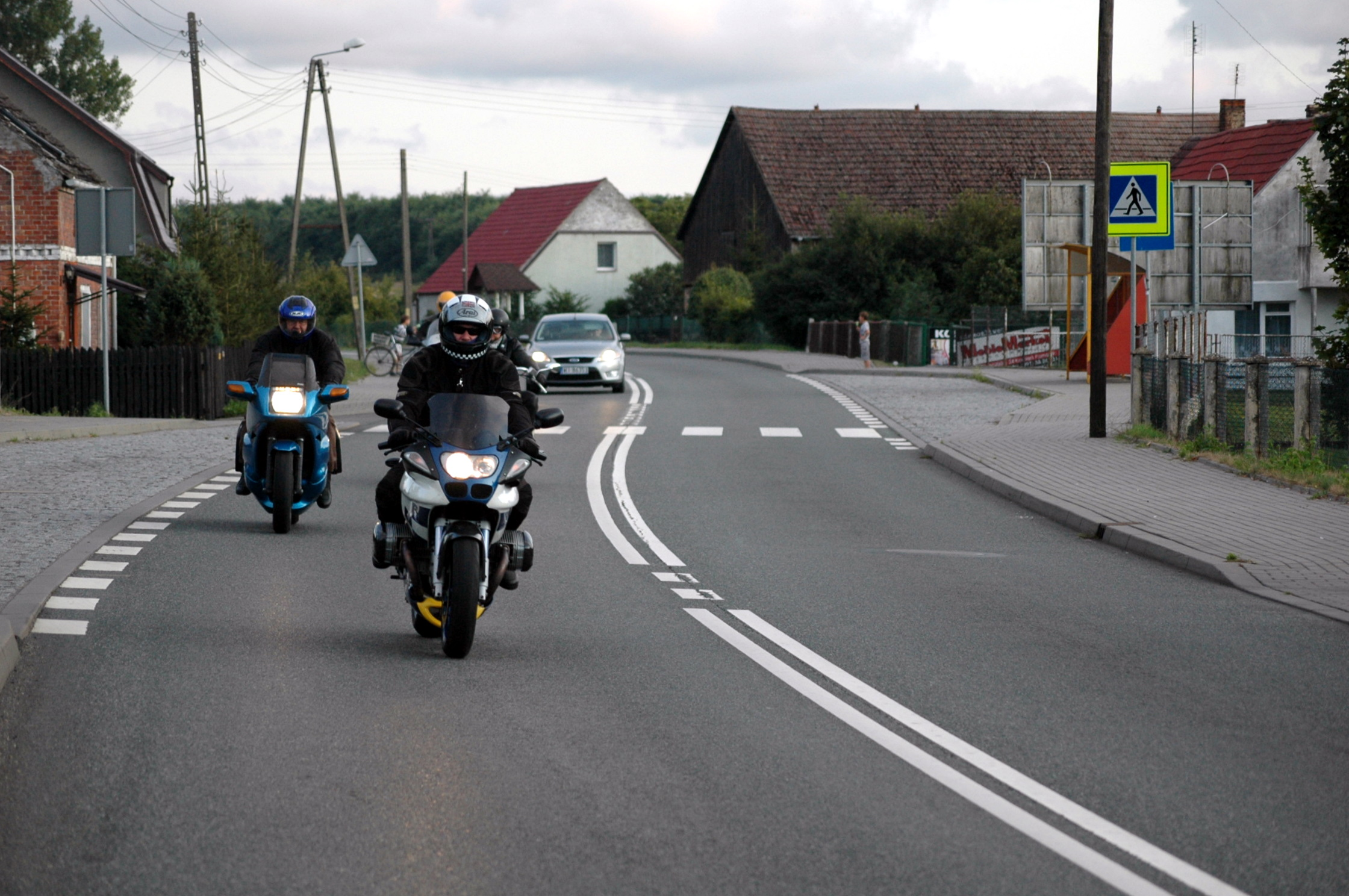
National road 3 in Ostromice

National road 3 (Polish: Droga krajowa nr 3) was a route in the Polish national road network. The highway connected the northwestern and southwestern regions of Poland, running from Świnoujście at the German border to Jakuszyce at the Czech border, traversing through the West Pomeranian, Lubusz and Lower Silesian voivodeships. National Road 3 was a component of European highway E65.

National road 3 has been upgraded to the express road S3, with the older highway mostly being classified as a gmina road, running parallel to or near the completed sections of the modern expressway.

In 2024, the National Road 3 has been fully replaced with the express road S3 (Świnoujście - Lubawka) and National road 5 (Poland) (Bolków) - Jakuszyce. However, the roads are still classified as the European Highway E65.

== Major cities and towns along the route ==
- Świnoujście (road 93)
- Goleniów (road 6)
- Szczecin (road 6, 10)
- Myślibórz (road 26)
- Gorzów Wielkopolski (road 22)
- Skwierzyna (road 24)
- Świebodzin (road 2)
- Sulechów (road 32)
- Zielona Góra (road 32)
- Drożów (road 12)
- Lubin (road 36)
- Legnica (road 4, 94)
- Bolków (road 5)
- Jelenia Góra (road 30)
- Jakuszyce, border with Czech Republic
