= Krakovets =

Rural locality in Lviv Oblast, Ukraine

Krakovets Краковець Krakowiec
- Rural settlement
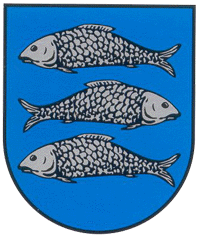
- Coat of arms
- Interactive map of Krakovets
- Location in Lviv Oblast Location in Ukraine
- Coordinates: 49°57′30″N 23°9′26″E
- Country: Ukraine
- Oblast: Lviv Oblast
- Raion: Yavoriv Raion
- Hromada: Yavoriv urban hromada
- Founded: 1320

Area
  - Total: 1.46 km^{2} (0.56 sq mi)
- Elevation: 209 m (686 ft)

Population (2022)
  - Total: 1,154
  - Density: 790/km^{2} (2,050/sq mi)
- Time zone: UTC+2 (EET)
  - Summer (DST): UTC+3 (EEST)
- Postal code: 81034
- Area code: +380 32(59)

Krakovets (Ukrainian: Краковець, Polish: Krakowiec, also found on American immigration documents as Krakowicz and Krakowice) is a rural settlement in Yavoriv Raion, Lviv Oblast, in western Ukraine. It lies on the Polish-Ukrainian border, roughly halfway between Lviv in Ukraine and Kraków in Poland on the European route E40, hosting the Korczowa-Krakovets border crossing. Krakovets belongs to Yavoriv urban hromada, one of the hromadas of Ukraine. The population was estimated at 1,154 (2022 estimate).

== History ==
The first record mentioning the settlement dates from 1320. In 1425 the town received Magdeburg rights and in 1520 the status as town was confirmed. In 1590 Aleksander Ostrogski built the Krakowiec castle. The town became property of the Cetner, Potocki and Lubomirski families and remained a small strategic outpost protecting the core territories of Crown of the Kingdom of Poland and its capital Kraków from invasions of the Khazar Khaganate, Varangians, Pechenegs, Golden Horde, Nogais, Ottoman Empire, Tatars, Cossacks, Grand Duchy of Moscow and their successors.

Until the Partitions of Poland in 1772 Krakowiec was part of the Przemyśl Land of the Ruthenian Voivodeship, part of Lesser Poland Province in the Crown of the Kingdom of Poland of the Polish–Lithuanian Commonwealth. During Partitions of Poland the town became part of Galicia in the Austro-Hungarian Empire.

In 1923 Krakowiec returned to Poland, but shortly after in 1939, according to the Molotov–Ribbentrop Pact, Krakowiec became victim of genocide, ethnocide and other crimes and atrocities detailed by Gestapo–NKVD conferences, e.g. the Massacres of Poles in Volhynia and Eastern Galicia performed by Ukrainians and after the establishment of District of Galicia in 1941 The Holocaust (Shoah) of the Jews. After World War II, Krakowiec became part of Ukrainian Soviet Socialist Republic, part of the Soviet Union and was since known as Krakovets. In 1991, Krakovets became part of independent Ukraine.

Until 26 January 2024, Krakovets was designated urban-type settlement. On this day, a new law entered into force which abolished this status, and Krakovets became a rural settlement.

== Changing nationalities ==
The Holocaust map: German extermination camps, marked with white skulls in black squares, set up by the SS in occupied Poland, 1942. The German Bełżec extermination camp was just 50 km north of Krakowiec.

In the Polish–Lithuanian Commonwealth and also between 1772 and 1918, under Austrian rule, and continuing under Polish rule until the Second World War, the inhabitants of Krakowiec were a multinational and multicultural mix of ethnic Ukrainians (including Boykos and Lemkos), Poles, Belarusians, Lithuanians, Silesians, Armenians, Lipka Tatars, Germans and Ashkenazi Jews. As a result of World War 2, Soviet invasion, and the Holocaust, Poles were deported or killed, Jews were murdered, and Krakovets became an exclusively Ukrainian town. In 1945 the remaining Polish survivors were deported, mainly to Silesia (Bytom, Brzeg, Wrocław, Legnica...).

== The destruction of the Jews of Krakowiec ==
Before the Nazi invasion of Poland and establishment of the General Government, it is estimated that between one-third and one-half of the citizens of Krakowiec—1,000 or more people—were Jewish. Krakowiec was also the birthplace of the Ukrainian Insurgent Army general Roman Shukhevych (1907-1950), who shot Jews on sight in at least two villages and is said to have been involved in the June–July 1941 massacre of over 4,000 Jews in pogroms in Lviv and other cities in western Ukraine. Following that atrocity, most of the Jews of Krakowiec perished in the ghettos, labor camps, and death camps of the holocaust.

The nearby Bełżec extermination camp, one of the biggest extermination camps in World War 2, was just around 50 km (30 miles) away.

== Border crossing ==
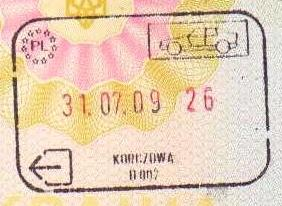
Schengen exit stamp from Korczowa.

The Korczowa-Krakovets border crossing with Poland is located in Krakovets. Across the border in Poland is the village Korczowa. As Poland became part of the Schengen Area on 21 December 2007, this border crossing is a Schengen external border. The European route E40 crosses the border here. The eastern terminus of the Polish A4 motorway and National Road 94 are located at Korczowa, both extending to Jędrzychowice on the Polish-German border, connecting with Ukrainian M10 highway leading to Lviv.
