= A8 autostrada (Poland) =

Motorway in Poland

Autostrada A8
- Autostradowa Obwodnica Wrocławia (AOW)

Route information
- Part of E67
- Maintained by GDDKiA
- Length: 22.6 km (14.0 mi)

Major junctions
- From: S8 - south-western side of Wrocław
- A4 - SW side of Wrocław "Lotnisko" junction - Wrocław Airport access S5 - north side of Wrocław
- To: S8 - NE side of Wrocław

Location
- Country: Poland
- Major cities: Wrocław

Highway system
- National roads in Poland; Voivodeship roads
← A 6	→ A 18

The A8 motorway (Polish: Autostrada A8) or Wrocław Motorway Bypass (Autostradowa Obwodnica Wrocławia, AOW) is a 26.8-kilometre (16.7 mi) motorway bypass of the city of Wrocław, Poland. The motorway includes the 122-metre (400 ft) high Rędziński Bridge over the Oder river.

Outside of Wrocław, A8 continues in an expressway standard as Expressway S8.

The motorway opened to traffic on 31 August 2011. It is not planned to be subject to tolling.

== Route description ==
Location	km	mi	Exit	Destinations	Notes
Nowa Wieś Wrocławska	6.5	4.0		A 4 – Zgorzelec, Katowice; DK 5 – Lubawka	Continues as expressway S8 to Magnice
Cesarzowice, Wrocław County	9	5.6		DW 347 – Kąty Wrocławskie DW 372 – Wrocław, Oporów	Oporów is an administrative district in Wrocław
Wrocław	13.3	8.3		Wrocław Airport, Muchobór	Access to Graniczna Street
Wrocław	16.4	10.2		DK 94 – Legnica, Opole, Zielona Góra, Centrum, Żerniki, Leśnica	* Centrum means center: Żerniki and Leśnica are administrative districts in Wrocław; Access to Stadion Wrocław
Wrocław	24	15		S 5 (Wrocław Północ) – Poznań; DK 5 – Wrocław, Centrum, Polanowice, Poświętne DW 359 – Psary	* Centrum means center: Polanowice and Poświętne are administrative districts in Wrocław; see scheme of junction
Wrocław	29.2	18.1		DW 372 – Wrocław, Pawłowice, Zakrzów, Psie Pole, Długołęka	* Continues as expressway S8 to Oleśnica, Piotrków Trybunalski and Warsaw: Pawłowice, Zakrzów and Psie Pole are administrative districts in Wrocław
1.000 mi = 1.609 km; 1.000 km = 0.621 mi

== Route history ==
Initial plans had the A8 motorway ran the entire route between Wrocław and Łódź, with a southern portion of the road continuing towards the Czech Republic to provide access to Prague. In 2000, the motorway was truncated to its current length bypassing the western and northern portions of Wroclaw, while the rest of the route was decided to be completed in an expressway standard as Expressway S8. During the campaign for the 2007 parliamentary elections, the Civic Platform party pledged to upgrade the connection to motorway standard, thus extending the A8 motorway. However, after forming a government following its victory, the party abandoned the idea, explaining that the required changes in planning would unacceptably delay the construction by many years.

On 1 September 2011, the Ministry of Infrastructure published draft regulation on the motorway's tolling. According to the ministry, the A8 motorway will not be subject to tolling for motorists, however the entire route of the motorway is subject to electronic toll collection system mandatory for vehicles heavier then 3.5 tons, known as e-TOLL.

== Images ==
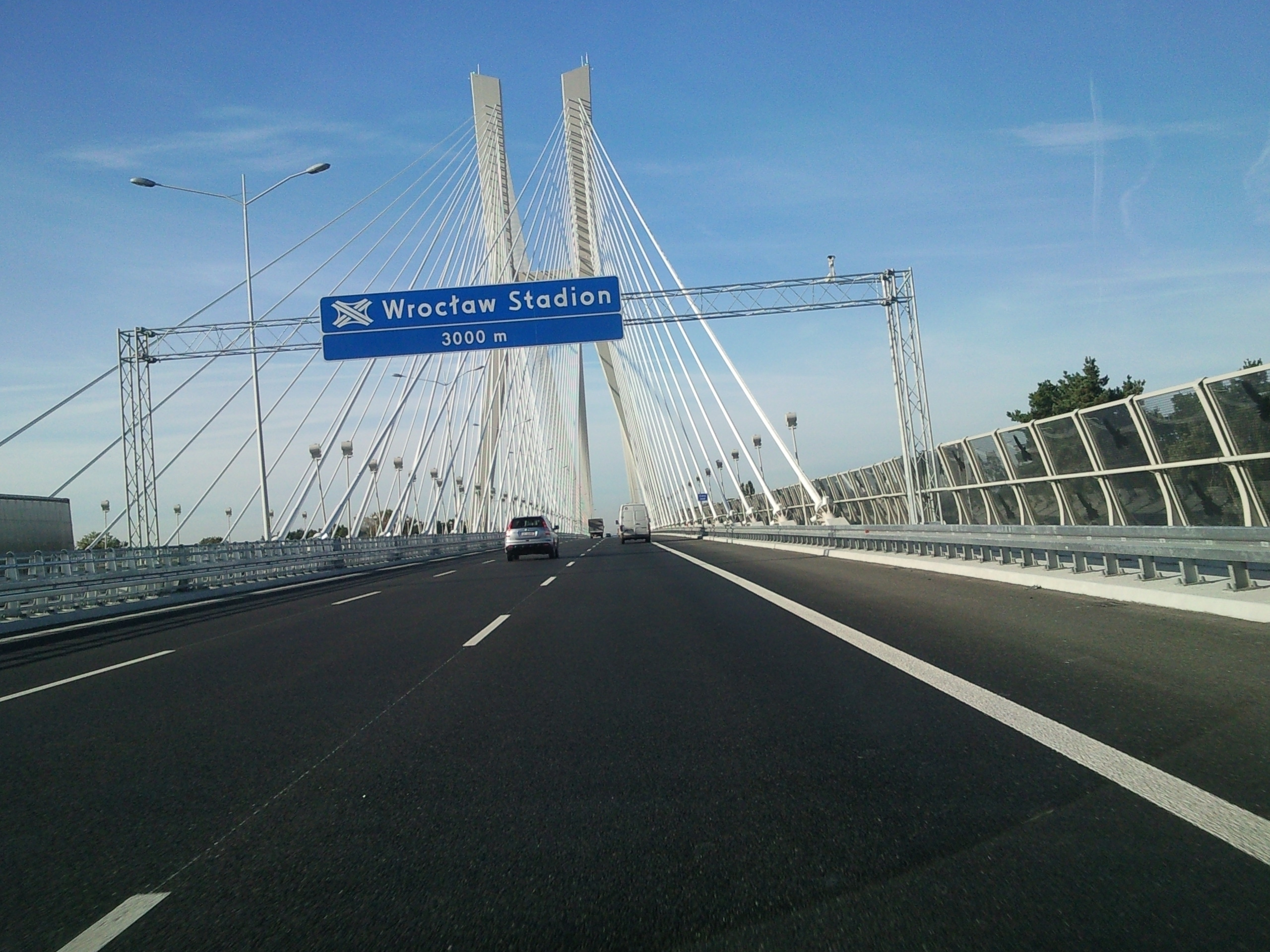
Rędziński Bridge

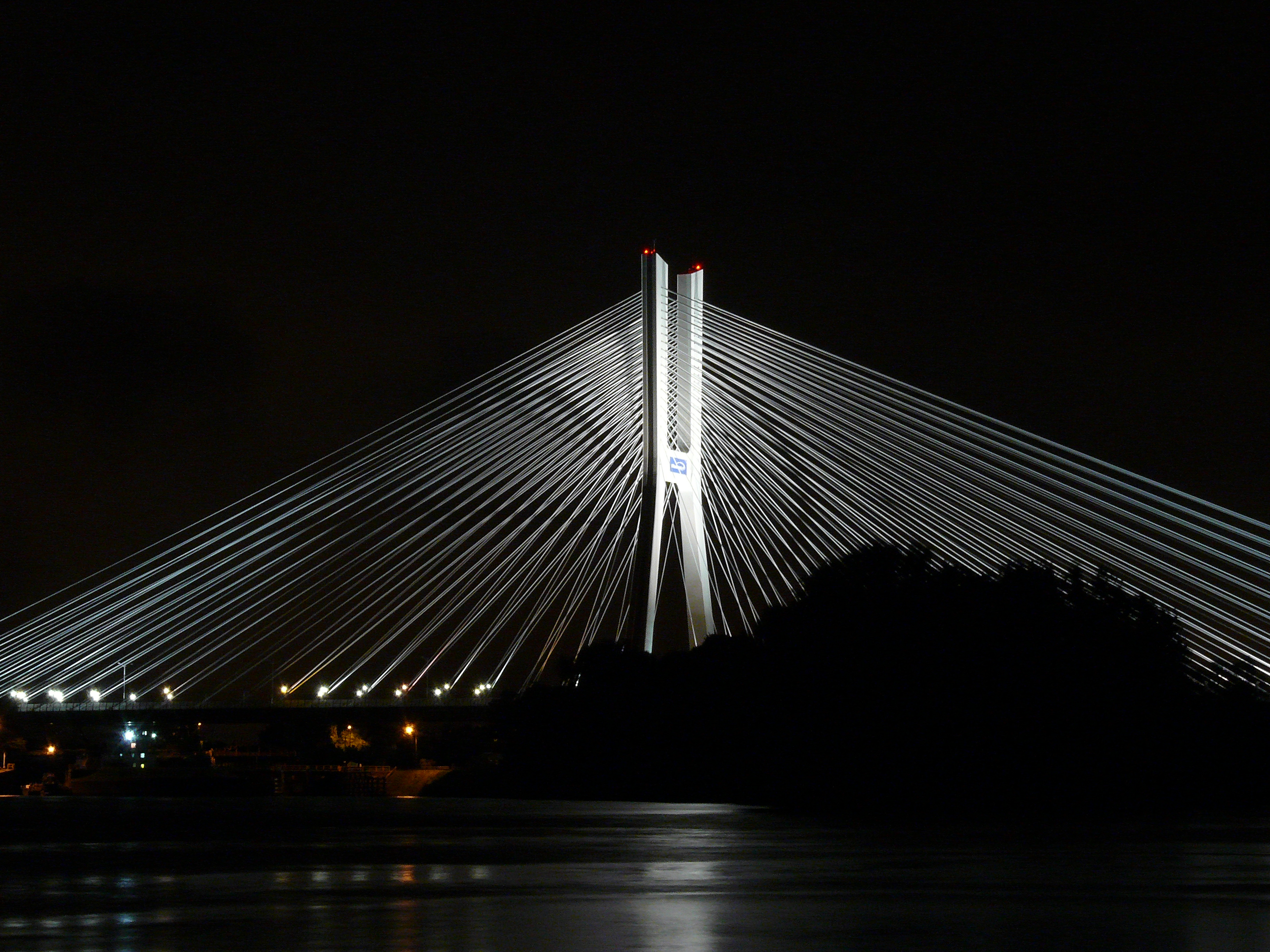
Rędziński Bridge

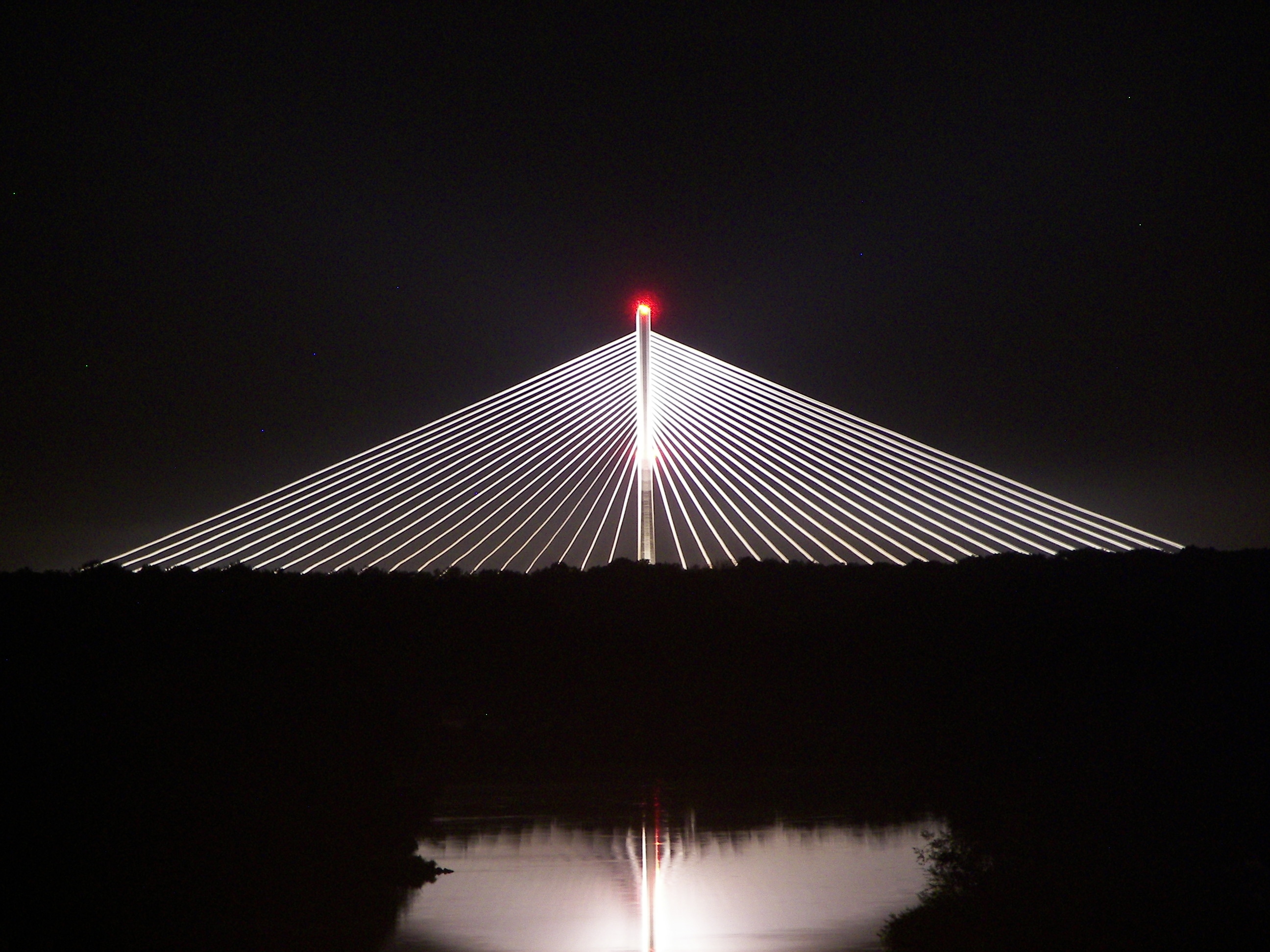
Rędziński Bridge

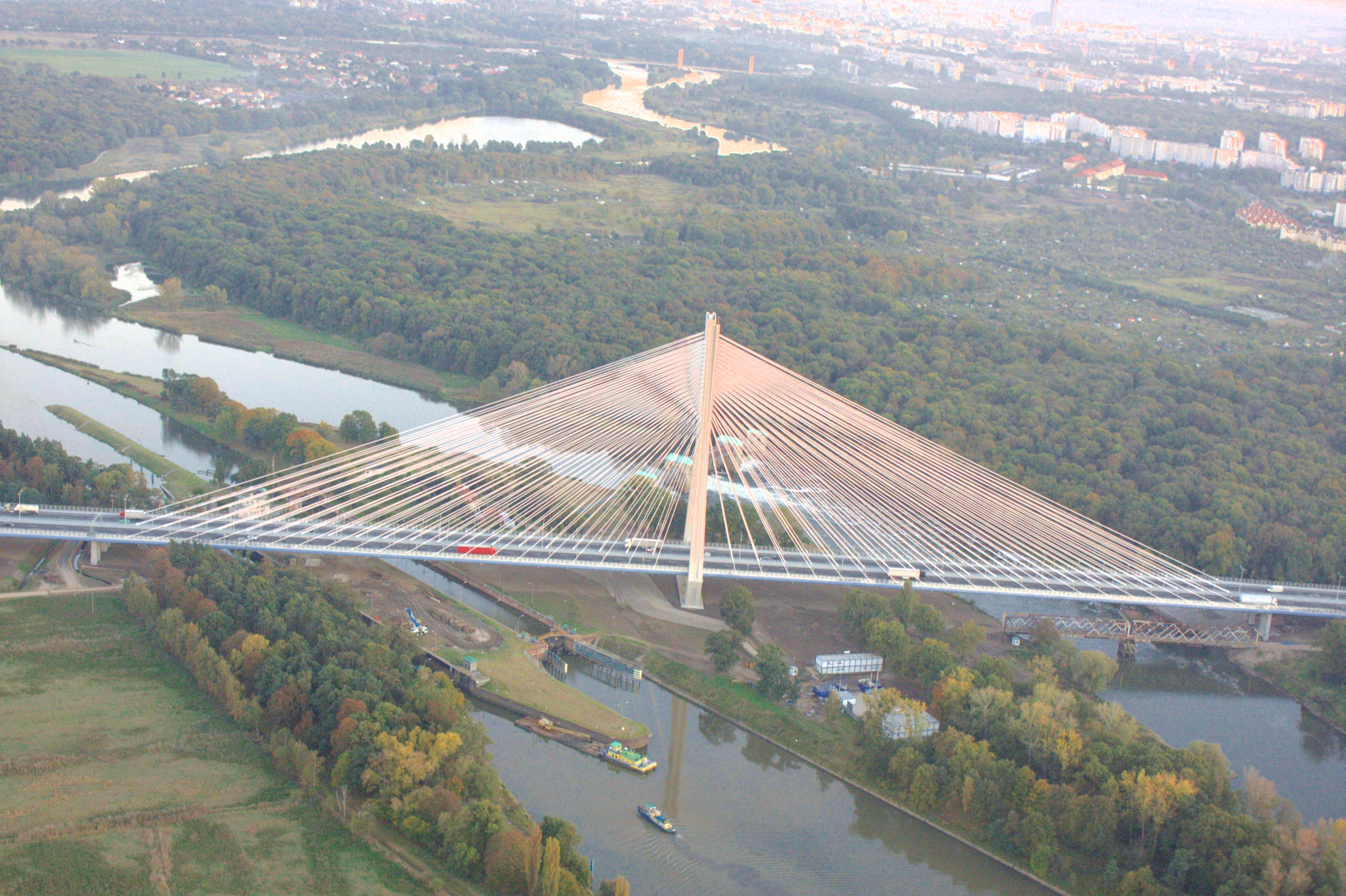
Rędziński Bridge

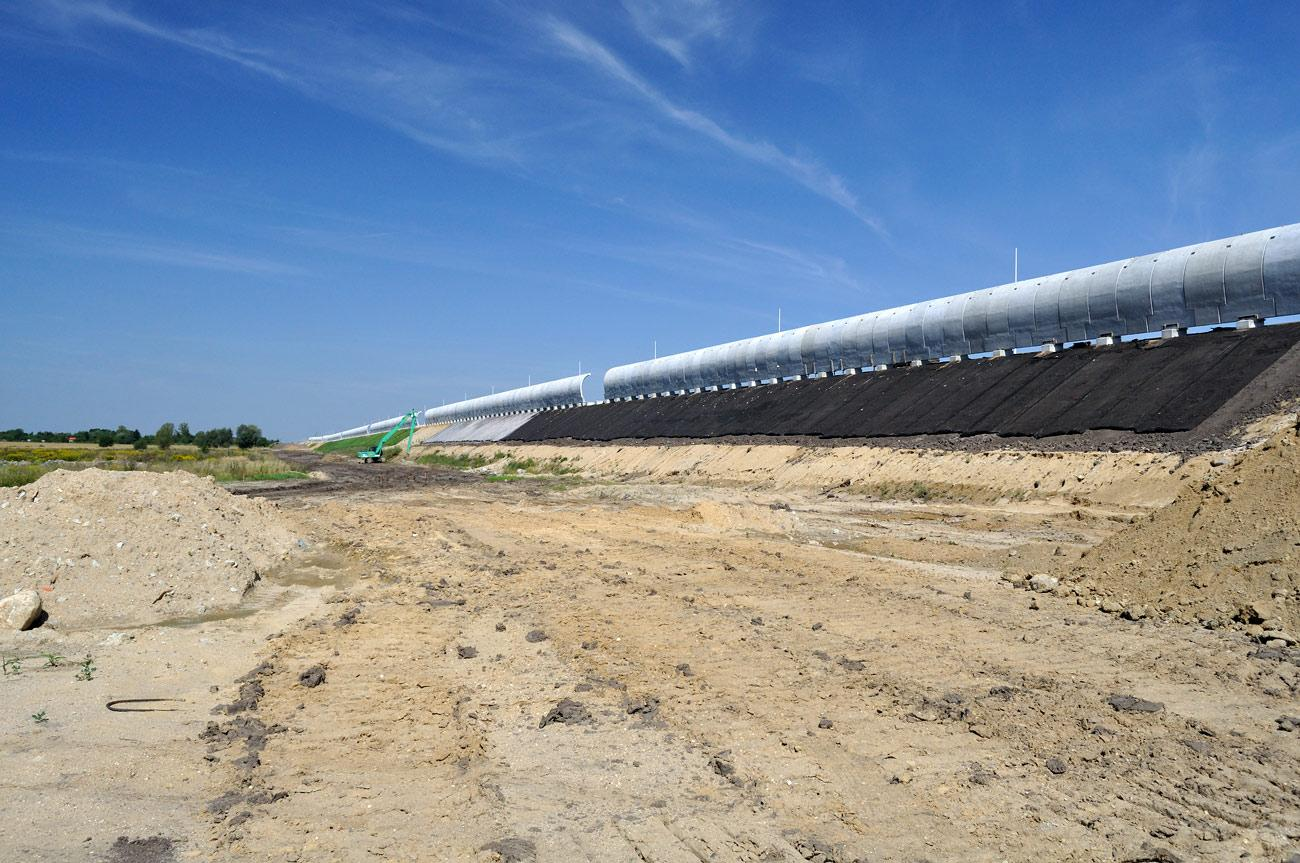

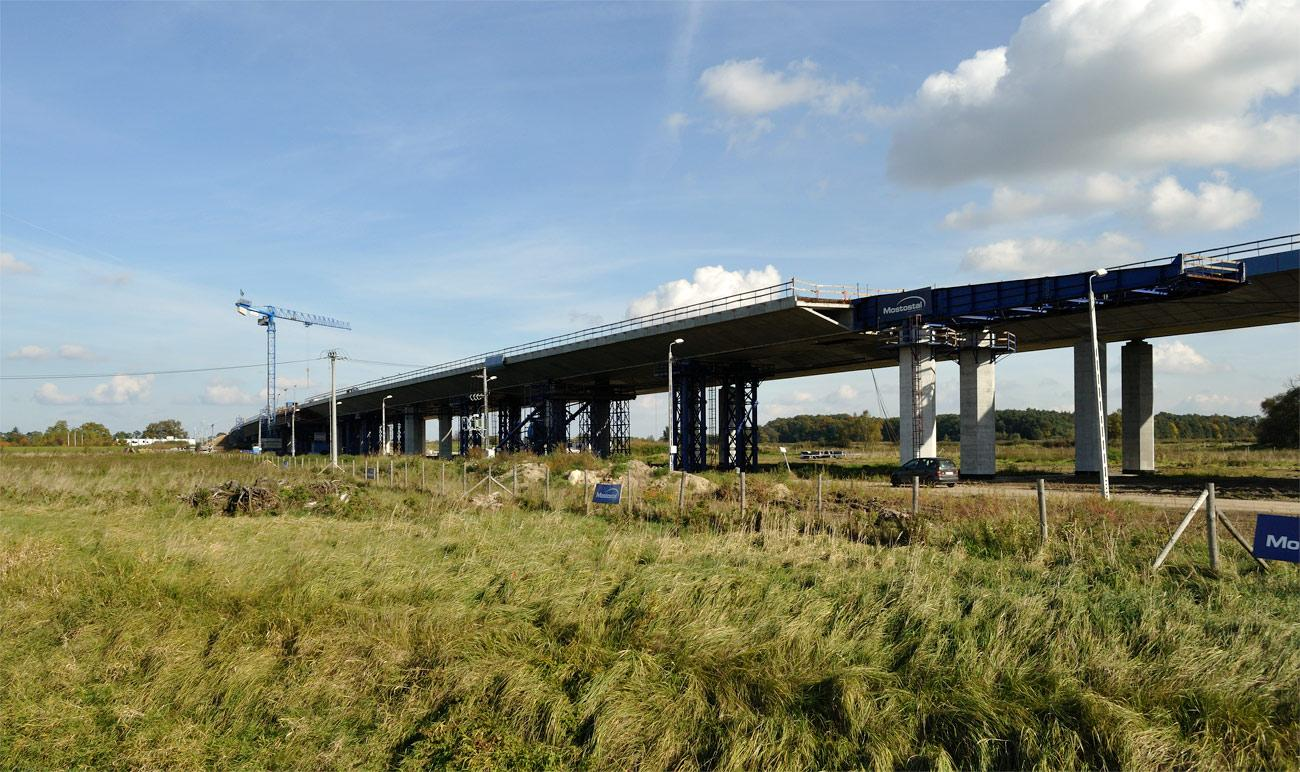

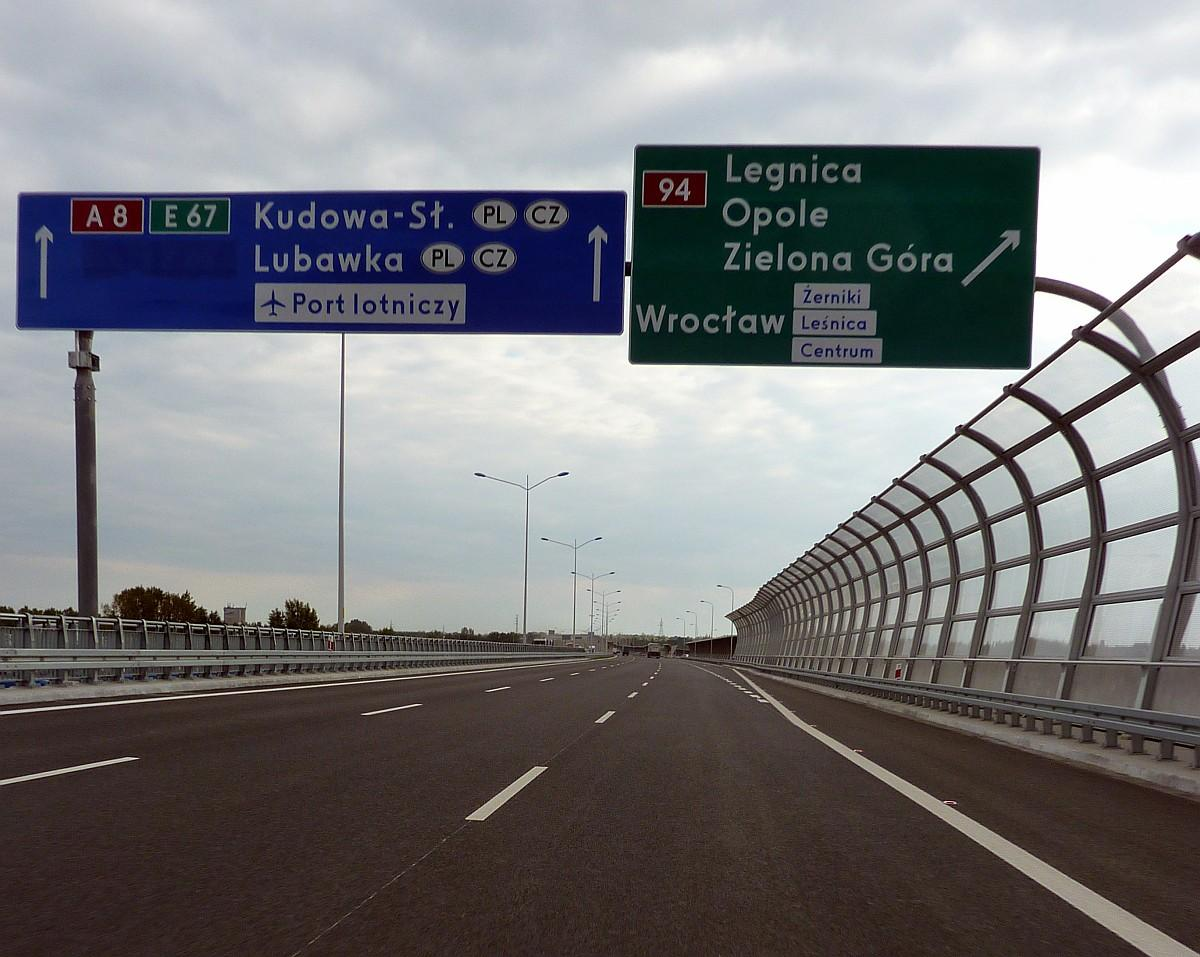
Wrocław Stadion junction

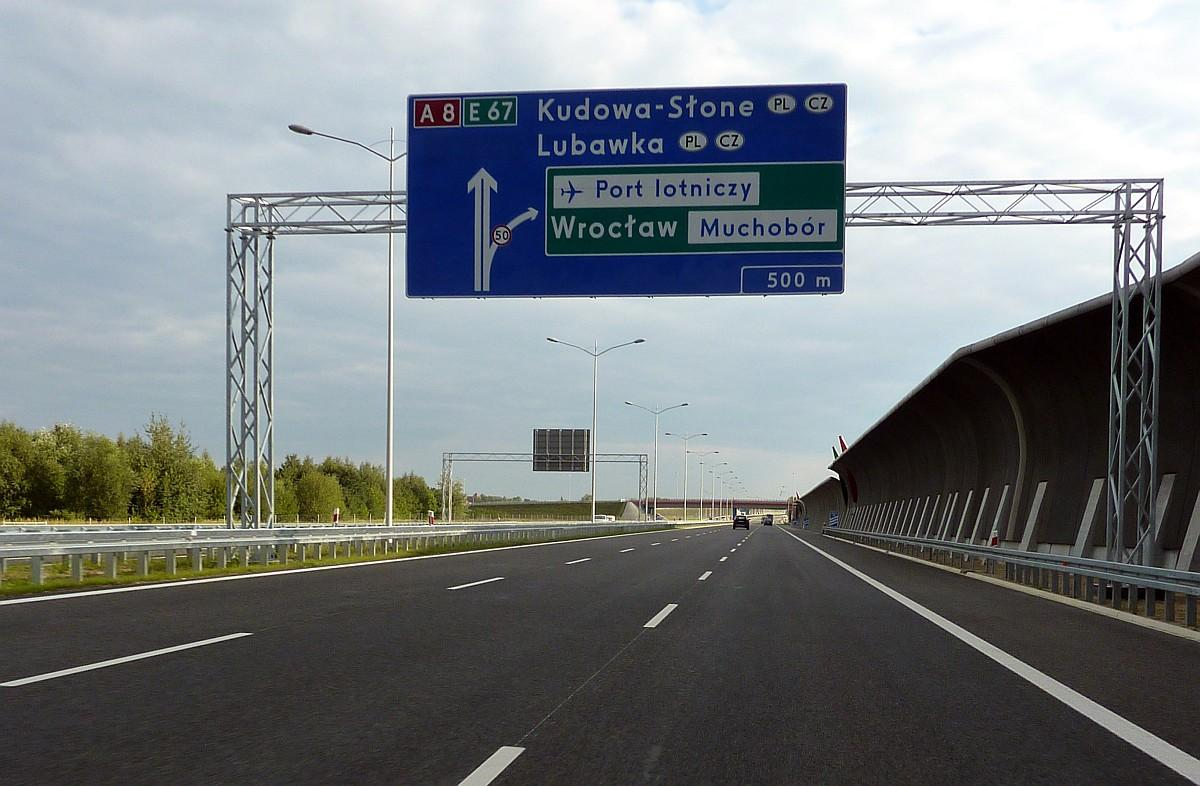
500 m before Wrocław Lotnisko junction

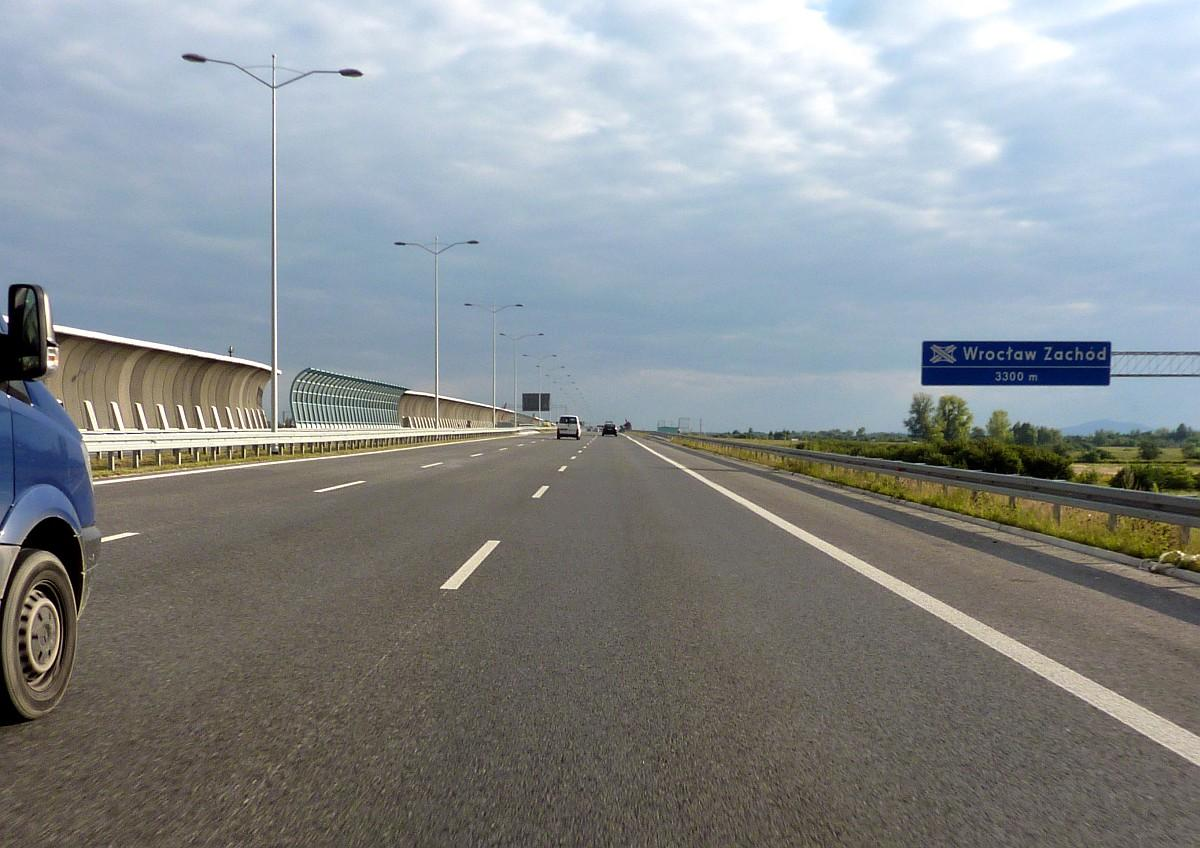
3300 m before Wrocław Zachód junction

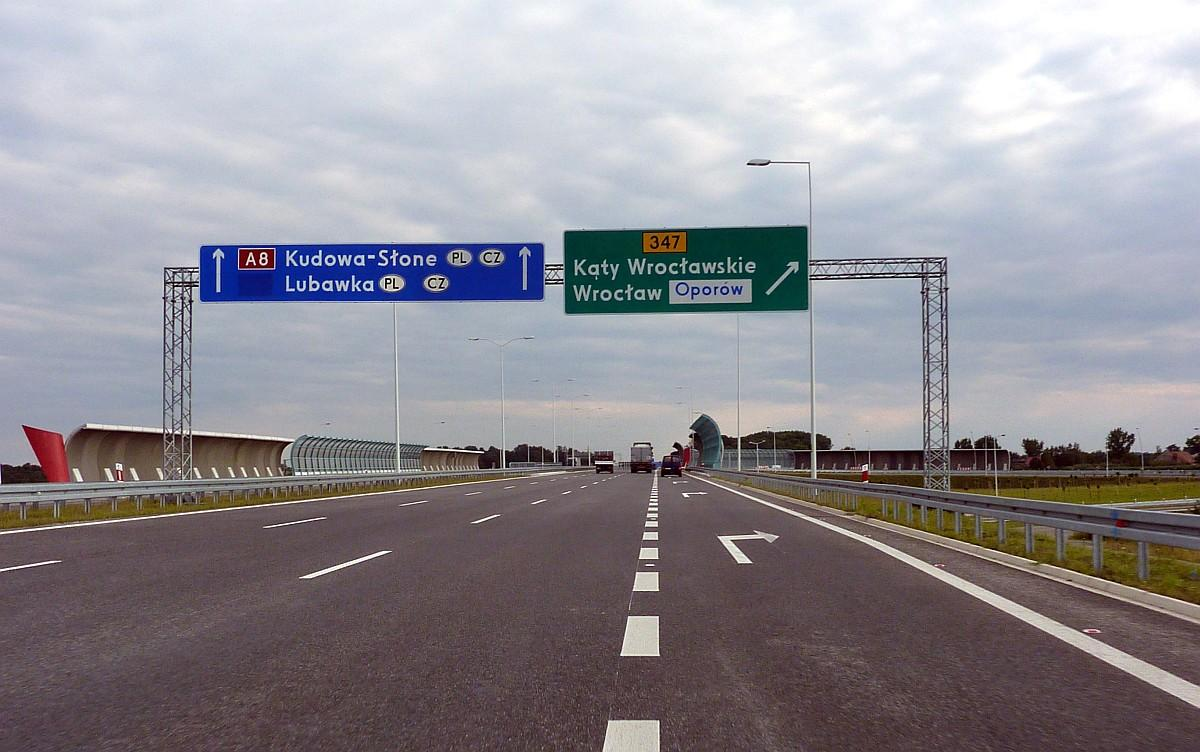
Wrocław Zachód junction

== See also ==
- European route E67
