= National road 85 (Poland) =

National road in Poland

Coordinates: 52°25′33″N 20°41′31″E

National Road 85
- Droga krajowa nr 85
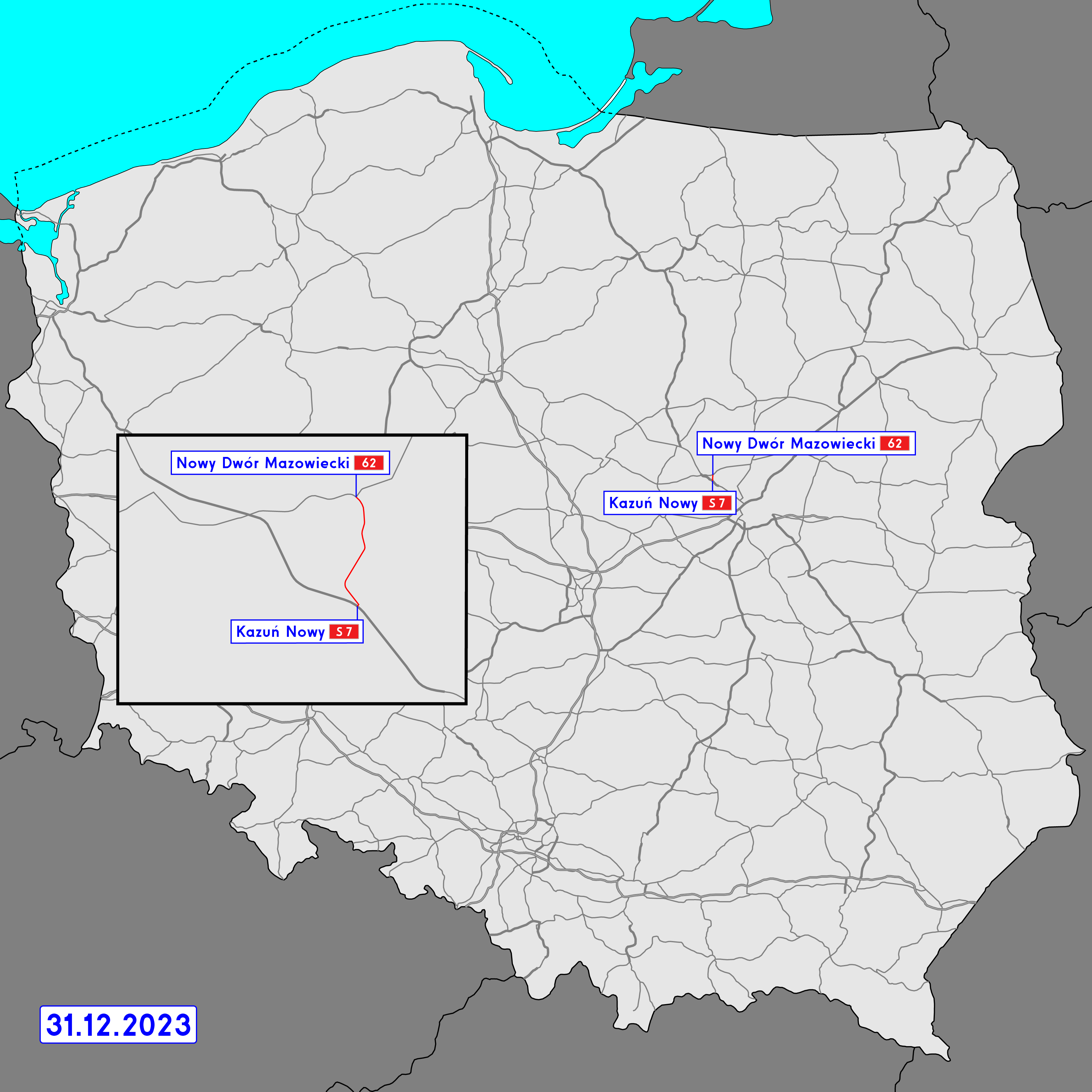

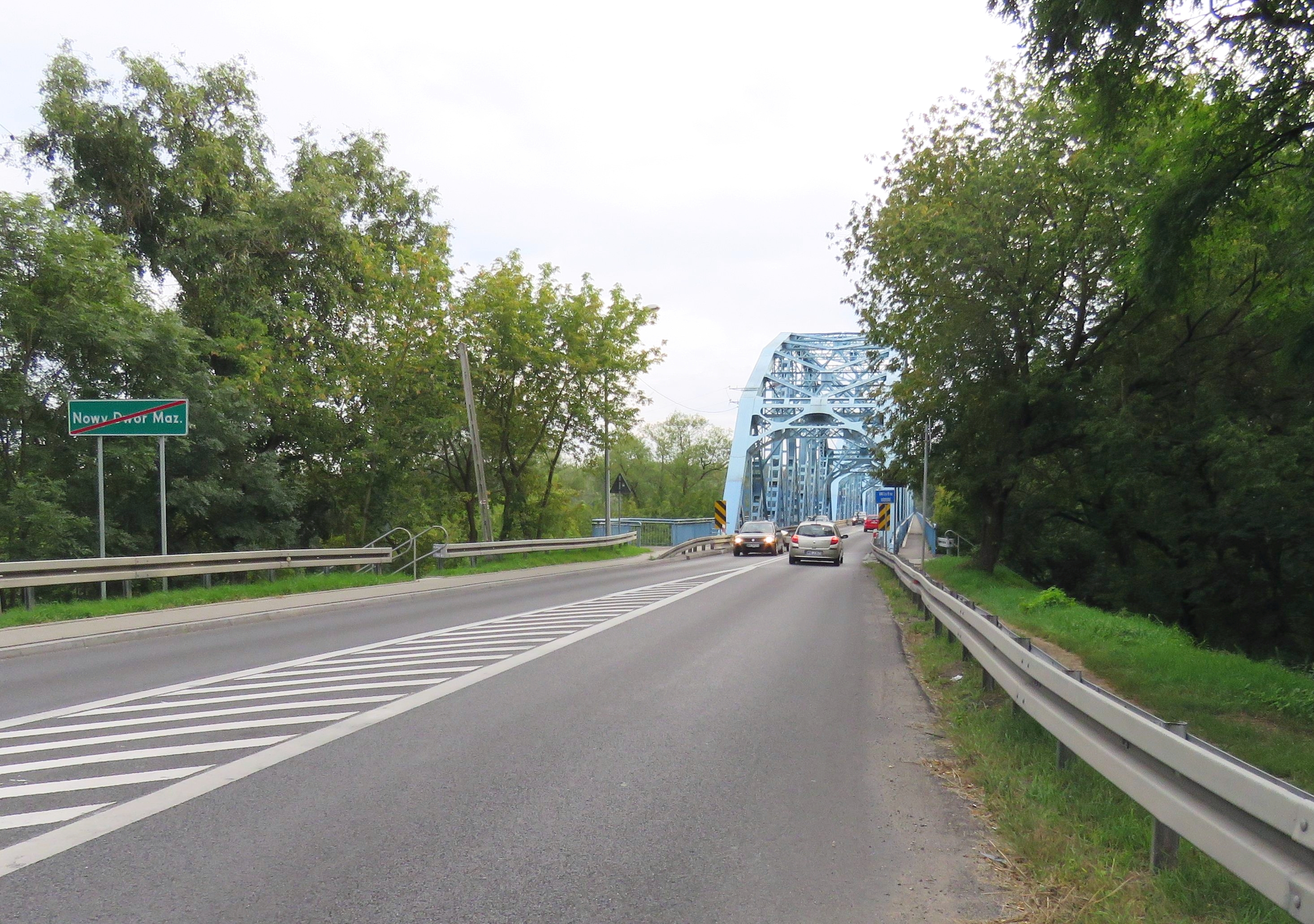

Route information
- Maintained by GDDKiA
- Length: 4.774 km (2.966 mi)
- Time period: 2000–2026

Major junctions
- From: Nowy Dwór Mazowiecki
- see Route plan section
- To: Kazuń Polski

Location
- Country: Poland
- Regions: Masovian Voivodeship
- Major cities: Nowy Dwór Mazowiecki, Kazuń

Highway system
- National roads in Poland; Voivodeship roads
← DK 84	→ DK 86

Droga krajowa nr 85 (translates from Polish as national road 85) is a former route belonging to the Polish national roads network. In April 2026 its number was removed from the ordinance of the national roads in Poland and its entire route has been incorporated into the national road 62 by General Directorate for National Roads and Highways.

Until 2026, the route has ran through the Masovian voivodeship, leading from a junction with national road 62 in Nowy Dwór Mazowiecki to a junction with the S7 expressway near Kazuń Polski.

== Major towns along the route ==
- Nowy Dwór Mazowiecki (national road 62)
- Kazuń (S7)

== Route plan ==
km	Icon	Name	Crossed roads
0		Nowy Dwór Mazowiecki	Żołnierzy Września Street
x		Roundabout in Nowy Dwór Mazowiecki	Chłodna and Kaszewskiego Streets
x		Nowy Dwór Mazowiecki	Warsaw Street
x		Nowy Dwór Mazowiecki	Wojska Polskiego Street
x		Kazuń Polski	
4.774		Kazuń interchange	
x		Expressway S7 in direction to Płońsk, Olsztyn, Elbląg, Gdańsk	
x		Expressway S7 in direction to Warsaw, Grójec, Radom, Kraków	
