= National road 98 (Poland) =

Former road designation in Poland

Coordinates: 51°06′34″N 17°03′10″E

National Road 98
- Droga krajowa nr 98

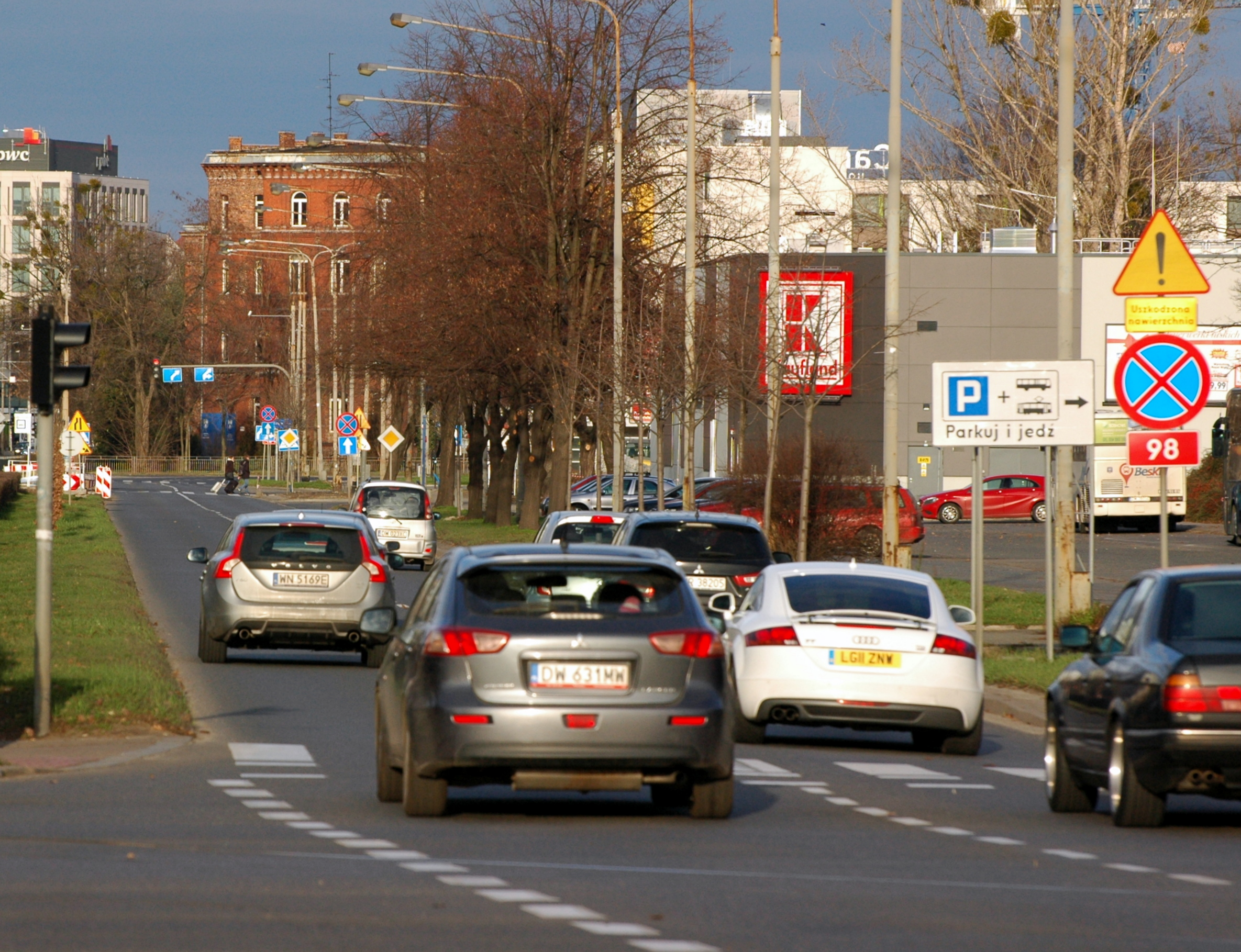
- National road 98 as Ślężna Street in Wrocław. Picture taken in December 2015

Route information
- History: 1985-2000: Renumbered to DK 28; 2011-2019: A8 motorway junction Wrocław Psie Pole–Długołęka downgraded to DW 372 and section in Wrocław downgraded to a gmina road
- Time period: 1985–2000, 2011–2019

Location
- Country: Poland
- Regions: Lower Silesian Voivodeship
- Major cities: Wrocław

Highway system
- National roads in Poland; Voivodeship roads
← DK 97	→ DK 1

Droga krajowa nr 98 (translates from Polish as national road 98) was a route belonging to Polish national roads network.

== History ==
=== 1985–2000 ===
The first time route 98 was introduced in 1985, as a part of road network reform. It ran from Wadowice through Maków Podhalański, Jordanów, Rabka, Limanowa, Nowy Sącz, Gorlice, Jasło, Krosno, Sanok, Kuźmina and Bircza to Przemyśl until the year 2000, when as a result of another reform the route 98 was decommissioned and replaced with road 28 existing to present day.

=== 2011–2019 ===
In 2011, after the Wrocław motorway bypass opened, road 98 was commissioned a second time. It ran entirely through Lower Silesian Voivodeship, leading from expressway S8 at junction Kobierzyce to Długołęka. In 2012 road 98 was rerouted – it began on a crossing with national road 5 in Wrocław and finished at the Wrocław Psie Pole junction at motorway A8 and expressway S8 near the city, following mostly the old route of national road 8. Road 98 was treated as an alternative route for the bypass, despite the fact that A8 is not a toll road.

Since January 1, 2020 road 98 is no longer a part of the national roads network. The stretch connecting motorway junction Wrocław Psie Pole with village Długołęka was downgraded to voivodeship road 372 (DW 372), with the further section through Wrocław downgraded to a gmina road.
