= E261 =

E261 can refer to:

- European route E261, a European route
- Potassium acetate, a chemical compound
