= National road 15 (Poland) =

National road in Poland

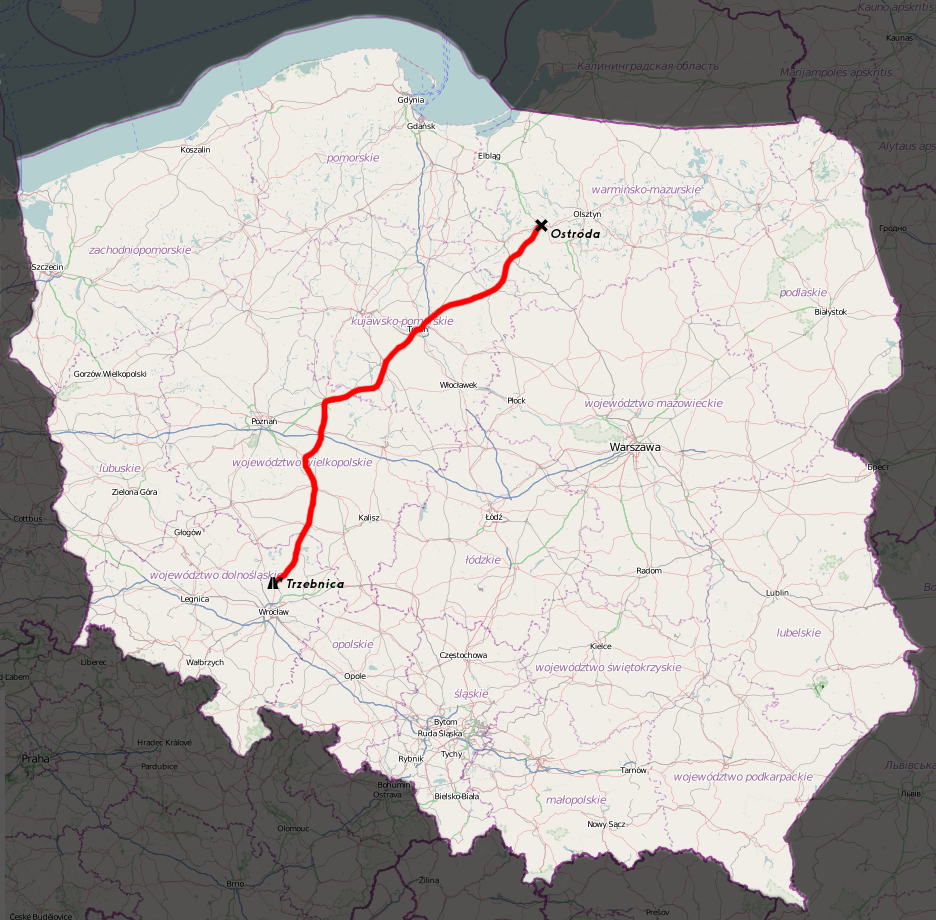

Route information
- Maintained by GDDKiA
- Length: 372 km (231 mi)
- Existed: 2000–present

Major junctions
- North end: Ostróda
- South end: Trzebnica

Location
- Country: Poland
- Regions: Lower Silesian Voivodeship; Greater Poland Voivodeship; Kuyavian-Pomeranian Voivodeship; Warmian-Masurian Voivodeship
- Major cities: Trzebnica, Krotoszyn, Jarocin, Września, Gniezno, Inowrocław, Toruń, Ostróda

Highway system
- National roads in Poland; Voivodeship roads
← DK 14	→ DK 16

National road 15 (Polish: Droga krajowa nr 15) is a 374 km long G class and GP class national road connecting Trzebnica with Ostróda. It runs through Lower Silesian Voivodeship, Greater Poland Voivodeship, Kuyavian-Pomeranian Voivodeship and Warmian-Masurian Voivodeship. It serves an alternative to National road 5 on Trzebnica - Gniezno segment while skipping Poznań. Later on it leads through farming lands in Kuyavia to Masuria. It crosses A2 motorway in Września.
