= Korczowa-Krakovets =

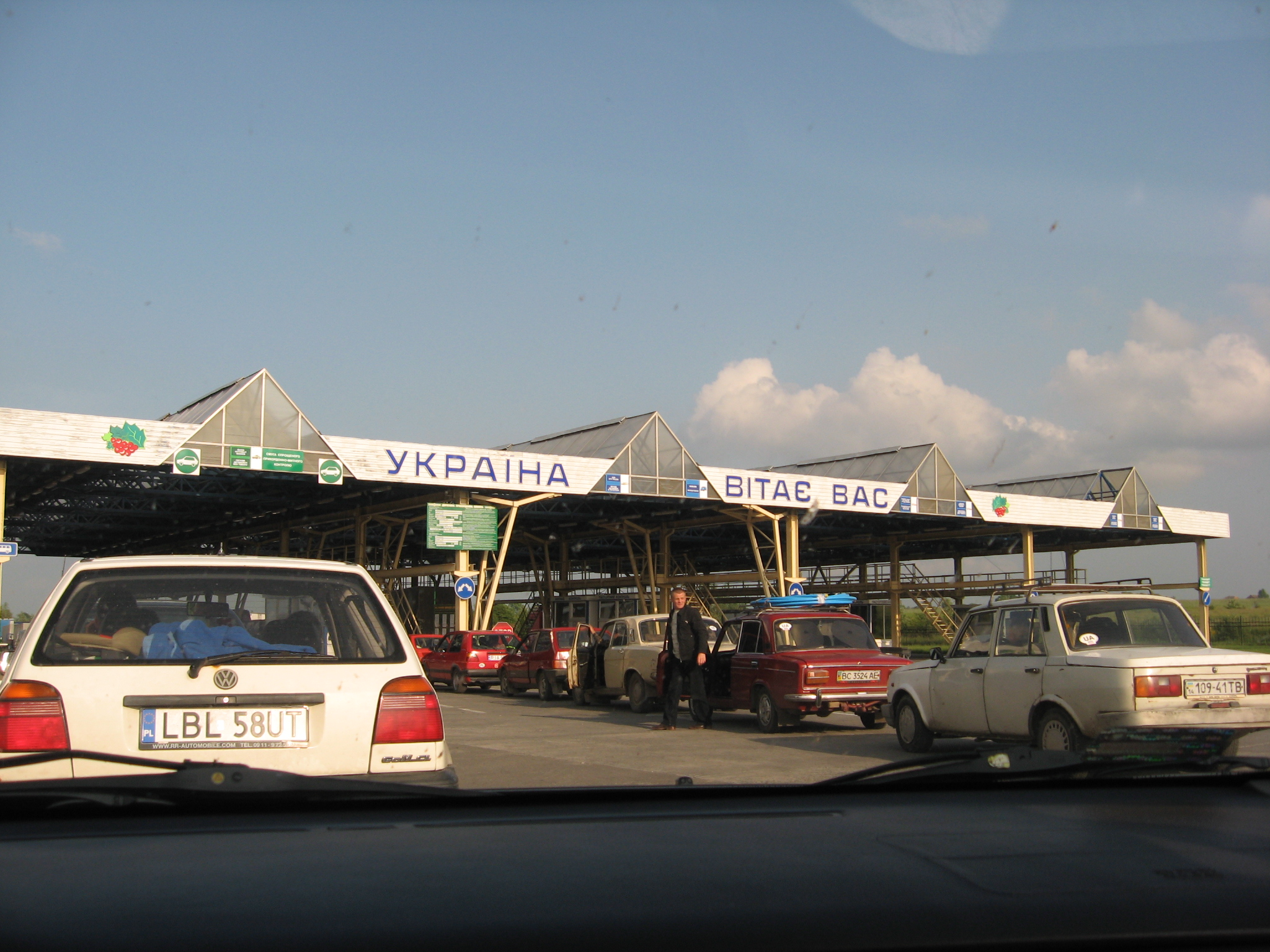
- Korczowa-Krakovets border crossing (EU-Ukraine)

Locaiton
- Country: Ukraine
- Location: Krakovets, Yavoriv Raion, Lviv Oblast
- Coordinates: 49°57′16.84″N 23°6′59.8″E

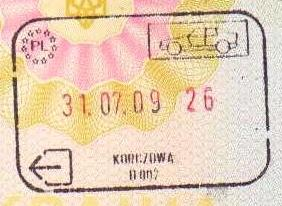
Exit passport stamp issued by the Polish Border Guard at the border crossing point

Korczowa-Krakovets is a land border crossing between Ukraine and Poland. On the Ukrainian side, it is located near the town of Krakovets, Yavoriv Raion, Lviv Oblast. On the Polish side it is the village of Korczowa, Jaroslaw County, Podkarpackie Voivodeship.

The crossing on Ukrainian side known as Korchova-Krakivets, is situated on autoroute E40 ( M 10). The type of crossing is automobile, status - international. The types of transportation for automobile crossings are passenger and freight. The port of entry is part of the Krakovets customs post of Lviv customs.

== History ==
Krakovets was incorporated as a private city in 1520. It remained in the Kingdom of Poland (Wojewodztwo Ruskie) until taken by the Austro-Hungarian Empire in 1772 during the First Partition of Poland. It remained under Austrian rule until 1918. From 1918 until September 1939, Krakowiec was in the Republic of Poland (Wojewodztwo Lwowskie). Following the Soviet invasion of Poland beginning on September 17, 1939, Krakowiec was incorporated into the USSR. After Nazi Germany's attack on the Soviet Union in June 1941, German occupation authorities put Krakovets in the District of Galicia in the General Government until Soviet forces took the town in 1944. As a result of the Soviet authorities crossing the border through Krakovets the city's population was evicted. From 1944 until 1991, Krakovets was in the USSR (Ukrainian Soviet Socialist Republic). Since 1991, Krakovets has been in Ukraine.

The opening of a new border crossing point was for the first time envisaged by the Agreement between the Government of Ukraine and the Government of the Republic of Poland on border crossing points of 18 May 1992.

From 1992 to 1996, the construction and practical opening of a new entry point on the western border of Ukraine was constantly hampered for various reasons.

Stepan Lukashik managed to convince the President of Ukraine Leonid Kuchma of the vital need for the construction of the facility, for the first time since 1996, "the wire curtain was cut" and the construction was completed, which was completed in record terms until the winter of 1997.

The opening of the new checkpoint was held on January 3, 1998, with the participation of Leonid Kuchma, Alexander Kwasniewski, Stepan Lukashik and Mieczysław Kasprzak.

Events of Euromaidan touched the checkpoint as the Ukrainian activists blocked it on February 19, 2014.

== See also ==
- Poland–Ukraine border
- State Border of Ukraine
- Highway M10 (Ukraine)
- Schengen Area
