= European route E261 =

Road in trans-European E-road network

E261

Major junctions
- From: E40 Bielany Wrocławskie

- E67 Wrocław E30 Poznań

- To: E75 Nowe Marzy

Location
- Countries: Poland
- Major cities: Wrocław; Leszno; Poznań; Gniezno; Bydgoszcz; Świecie

Highway system
- International E-road network; A Class; B Class

European route E 261 is a Class B road part of the International E-road network. It begins in Bielany Wrocławskie near Wrocław and ends in Nowe Marzy near Świecie.

Route: Bielany Wrocławskie – Wrocław – Leszno – Poznań – Gniezno – Bydgoszcz – Świecie – Nowe Marzy.

E261 follows the route of Polish national road 5 for its entire length. It is the only European route in Poland that does not cross the country border or even approach it. On some older road maps of Poland the route was extended from Bielany Wrocławskie to Bolków.

== Route ==
- Poland
  - S 5 / DK 91: Nowe Marzy ( E75) – Świecie
  - S 5: Świecie – Bydgoszcz
  - S 5 / DK 25: Bydgoszcz
  - S 5 / S 10 / DK 25: Bydgoszcz
  - S 5: Bydgoszcz – Szubin – Gniezno – Poznań ( E30)
  - A 2 / S 5 / S 11: Poznań ( E30)
  - S 5: Poznań ( E30) – Leszno – Rawicz – Wrocław ( E67)
  - DK 5: Wrocław ( E67) – Bielany Wrocławskie ( E40)
