= Korczowa =

- Village
- Interactive map of Korczowa
- Location within Poland
- Coordinates: 49°57′N 23°4′E
- Country: Poland
- Voivodeship: Subcarpathian
- County: Jarosław
- Gmina: Radymno
- Population: 660
- Postal code: 37-552
- Area code: (+48) 16

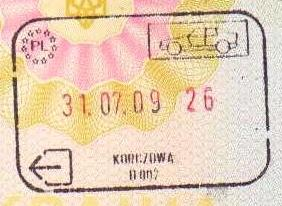
Schengen exit stamp from Korczowa.

Korczowa [kɔrˈt͡ʂɔva] is a village in the administrative district of Gmina Radymno, within Jarosław County, Subcarpathian Voivodeship, in south-eastern Poland, close to the border with Ukraine.

Before World War II the settlement was a farmstead in Gnojnice which were a suburb of nearby Krakowiec.

The Korczowa-Krakovets road border crossing with Ukraine is located nearby. As Poland became part of the Schengen Area on 21 December 2007, this border crossing is a Schengen external border. The European route E40 crosses the border here. The eastern terminus of Poland's A4 motorway and National Road 94 are located at Korczowa.
