= Kazuń Polski =

- Village
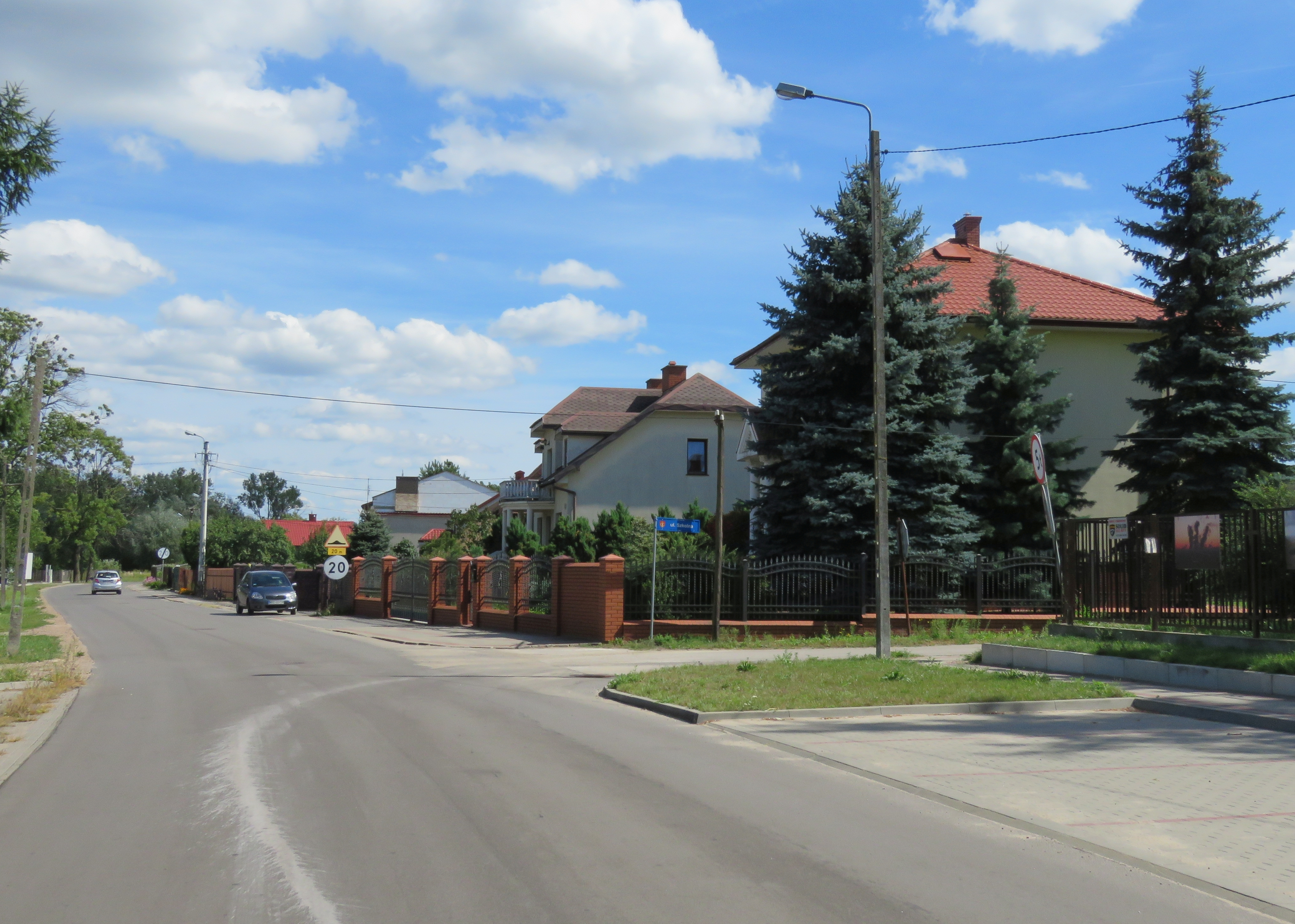

- Location within Poland
- Coordinates: 52°24′2″N 20°39′47″E
- Country: Poland
- Voivodeship: Masovian
- County: Nowy Dwór
- Gmina: Czosnów
- Population: 450

Kazuń Polski [ˈkazuɲ ˈpɔlski] is a village in the administrative district of Gmina Czosnów, within Nowy Dwór County, Masovian Voivodeship, in east-central Poland.
