= National road 97 (Poland) =

Road in Poland, connecting Rzeszów with motorway A4 and expressway S19

National Road 97
- Droga krajowa nr 97
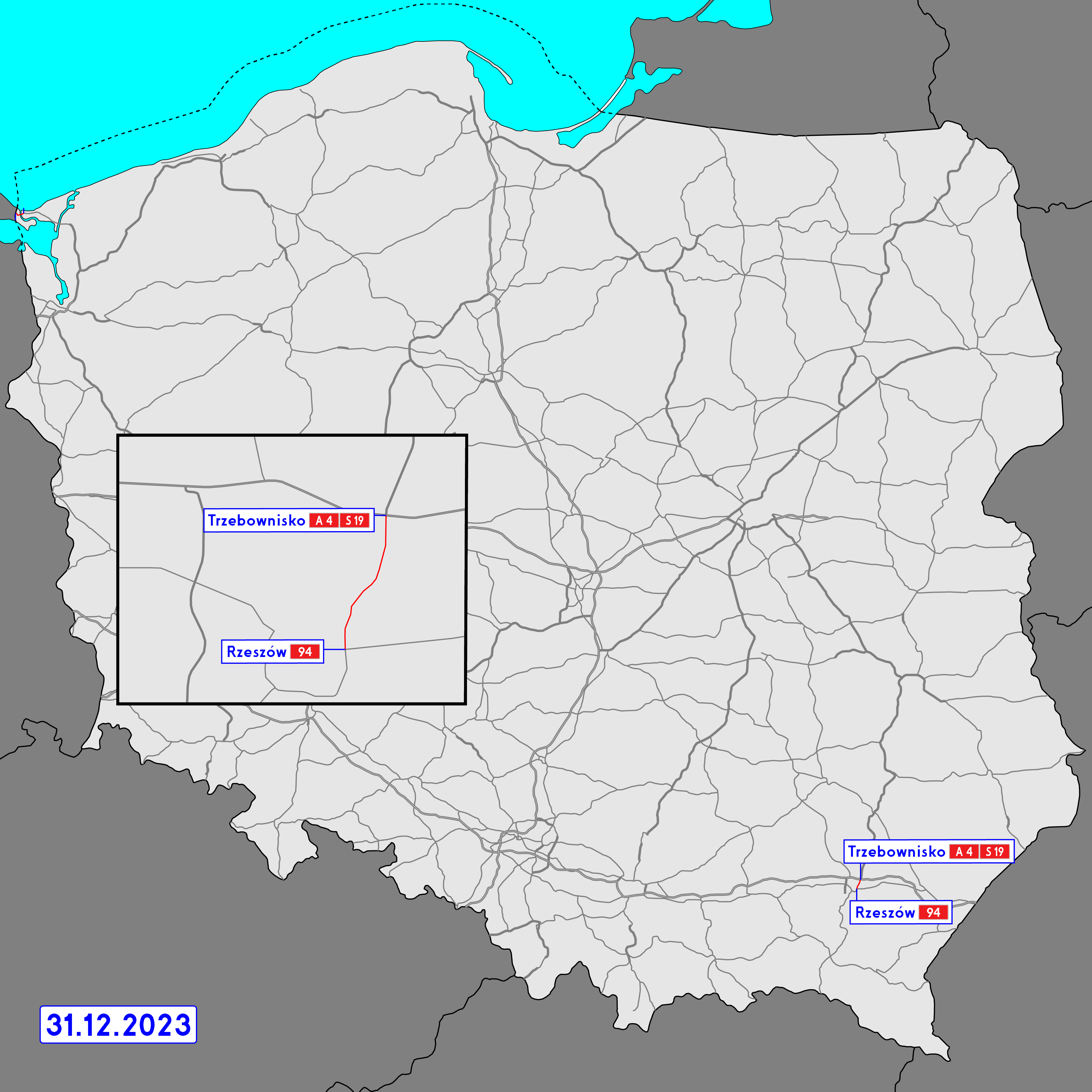

Route information
- Maintained by GDDKiA
- Length: 4.5 km (2.8 mi)
- Existed: 20 December 2013–present

Major junctions
- see Route plan section

Location
- Country: Poland
- Regions: Podkarpackie Voivodeship

Highway system
- National roads in Poland; Voivodeship roads
← DK 96	→ DK 98

National road 97 (Polish: Droga krajowa 97, abbreviated DK 97) is a route which joins the A4 motorway (at the junction Rzeszów West) with the road Rzecha (at the Jacek Kuroń roundabout) in Rzeszów. The route was built after the decision 60 made by the General Directorate for National Roads and Highways on 20 December 2013, which was put in place from 1 January 2014.

Before 2000, road 97 used to run from Nowy Targ–Czarna Góra–Jurgów to the Slovak border. This is now part of road 49.

== Route plan ==
km	Icon	Name
0		Dębica, Tarnów, Kraków
0		Jarosław, Korczowa-Krakowiec Border Crossing
0		Nisko, Lublin
0		Rzeszów Wschód Junction
0.2		Viaduct over a local road
1.2		Viaduct over a local road
1.4		Bridge over the river of Stary Wisłok
1.6		Bridge over the river of Stary Wisłok
2.3		Viaduct over the Spichlerzowa road in Rzeszów
4.2		Roundabout in Rzeszów
