= Classes and categories of public roads in Poland =

In Poland, public roads are classified into two kinds of road hierarchies: road classes (according to technical and functional parameters) and road categories (according to the function in the road network).

== Classes ==
Road classes are defined by the executive resolution of the Minister of Infrastructure of 24 June 2022. The document specifies technical parameters of public roads, including design speeds, number of carriageways and traffic lanes, surface and shoulder requirements, etc.

Symbol	Class name	Design speed (Note: Standard preferred design speed, from which exceptions are allowed and provided. Design speed differs from speed limits, see Speed limits in Poland.)	
Symbol	Class name	Within built-up area	Outside built-up area
A	motorway (autostrada)	—	140 km/h (87 mph)
S	expressway (ekspresowa)	—	130 km/h (81 mph)
GP	main of high speed traffic (główna ruchu przyspieszonego)	70 km/h (43 mph)	110 km/h (68 mph)
G	main (główna)	60 km/h (37 mph)	100 km/h (62 mph)
Z	collector (zbiorcza)	50 km/h (31 mph)	80 km/h (50 mph)
L	local (lokalna)	40 km/h (25 mph)	60 km/h (37 mph)
D	access (dojazdowa)	30 km/h (19 mph)	40 or 30 km/h (25 or 19 mph)

== Categories ==
Road categories are defined by the Act on Public Roads of 21 March 1985 and assigned to classes by the executive resolution of the Minister of Infrastructure of 24 June 2022.

Category	Class						
Category	A	S	GP	G	Z	L	D
National road droga krajowa	standard	standard	standard	allowed in difficult conditions			
Voivodeship road droga wojewódzka			allowed	standard	allowed in difficult conditions		
County road droga powiatowa			allowed	allowed	standard	allowed in difficult conditions	
Municipal road droga gminna			allowed	allowed	allowed	standard	standard

== See also ==
- Transport in Poland § Road transport
