= Speed limits in Poland =

Polish speed limits

Speed limits in Poland vary depending on the type of road and the type and weight of the vehicle (speed limit values are given in kilometers per hour):

	Motorways	Expressways (dual carriageway)	Expressways (single carriageway) Other roads (dual carriageway)	Other roads	Built-up areas	Residential areas
Cars and motorcycles	140	120	100	90	50	20
Buses	80 (100 with a special permit).	80 (100 with a special permit).	80	70	50	20
Heavy goods vehicles (> 3.5 t)	80	80	80	70	50	20
Cars and vans with trailers	80	80	80	70	50	20
for car towing	60 (Only roadside assistance can tow)	60	60	60	30	20

The limits shown above apply unless otherwise stated, as road signs may prescribe a lower or a higher speed limit (e.g. limits of 70 km/h or (occasionally) higher can be found on urban dual carriageways).

A higher night speed limit (60 km/h) used to apply in urban areas from 23:00 to 5:00 until 1 June 2021.

== Signs ==
Speed limit signs

5 km/h (3 mph)

10 km/h (6 mph)

20 km/h (12 mph)

30 km/h (19 mph)

40 km/h (25 mph)

50 km/h (31 mph)

60 km/h (37 mph)

70 km/h (43 mph)

80 km/h (50 mph)

90 km/h (56 mph)

100 km/h (62 mph)

110 km/h (68 mph)

120 km/h (75 mph)

130 km/h (81 mph)

140 km/h (87 mph)

== See also ==
- Highways in Poland
