= Nowe Marzy =

Village in Kociewie

- Village
- Location within Poland
- Coordinates: 53°28′0″N 18°39′34″E
- Country: Poland
- Voivodeship: Kuyavian-Pomeranian
- County: Świecie
- Gmina: Dragacz
- Population: 160

Nowe Marzy [ˈnɔvɛ ˈmarzɨ] is a village in the administrative district of Gmina Dragacz, within Świecie County, Kuyavian-Pomeranian Voivodeship, in north-central Poland. Nowe Marzy is located within the ethnocultural region of Kociewie.

It is near the A1 motorway from Gdańsk to Gorzyczki, which between 2008 and 2011 ended there but has since been extended.
