= National road 94 (Poland) =

National road in Poland

National Road 94
- Droga krajowa nr 94
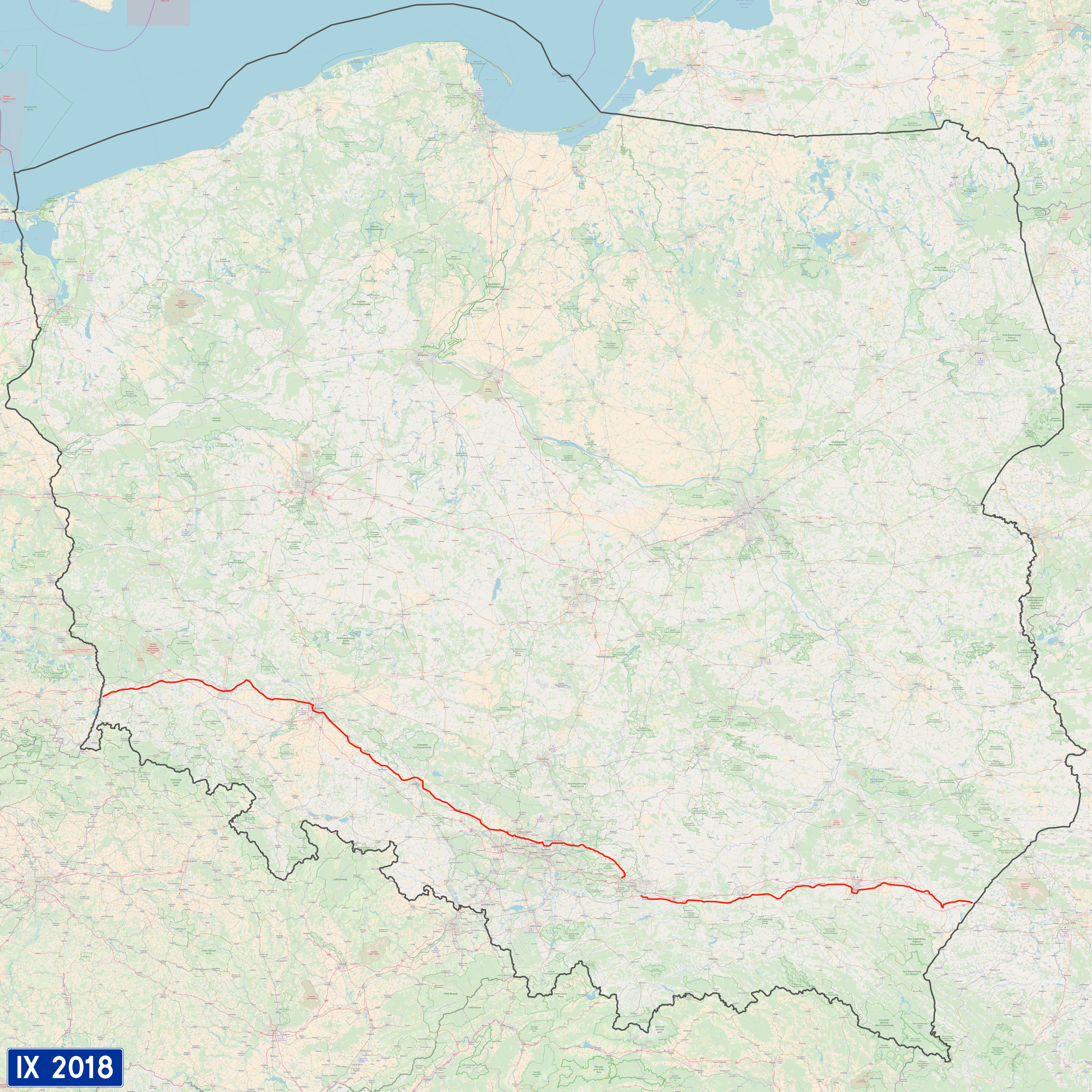

Route information
- Maintained by GDDKiA
- Length: 675 km (419 mi)

Major junctions
- West end: A4, Zgorzelec; 51.1724°N 15.0303°E
- East end: A4, Korczowa; 49.96113°N 23.09350°E

Location
- Country: Poland
- Major cities: Bolesławiec, Legnica, Środa Śląska, Wrocław, Oława, Brzeg, Opole, Strzelce Opolskie, Zabrze, Bytom, Piekary Śląskie, Siemianowice Śląskie, Czeladź, Będzin, Sosnowiec, Dąbrowa Górnicza, Sławków, Olkusz, Kraków, Wieliczka, Bochnia, Brzesko, Tarnów, Dębica, Rzeszów, Łańcut, Przeworsk, Korczowa

Highway system
- National roads of Poland
← DK 93	→ DK 95

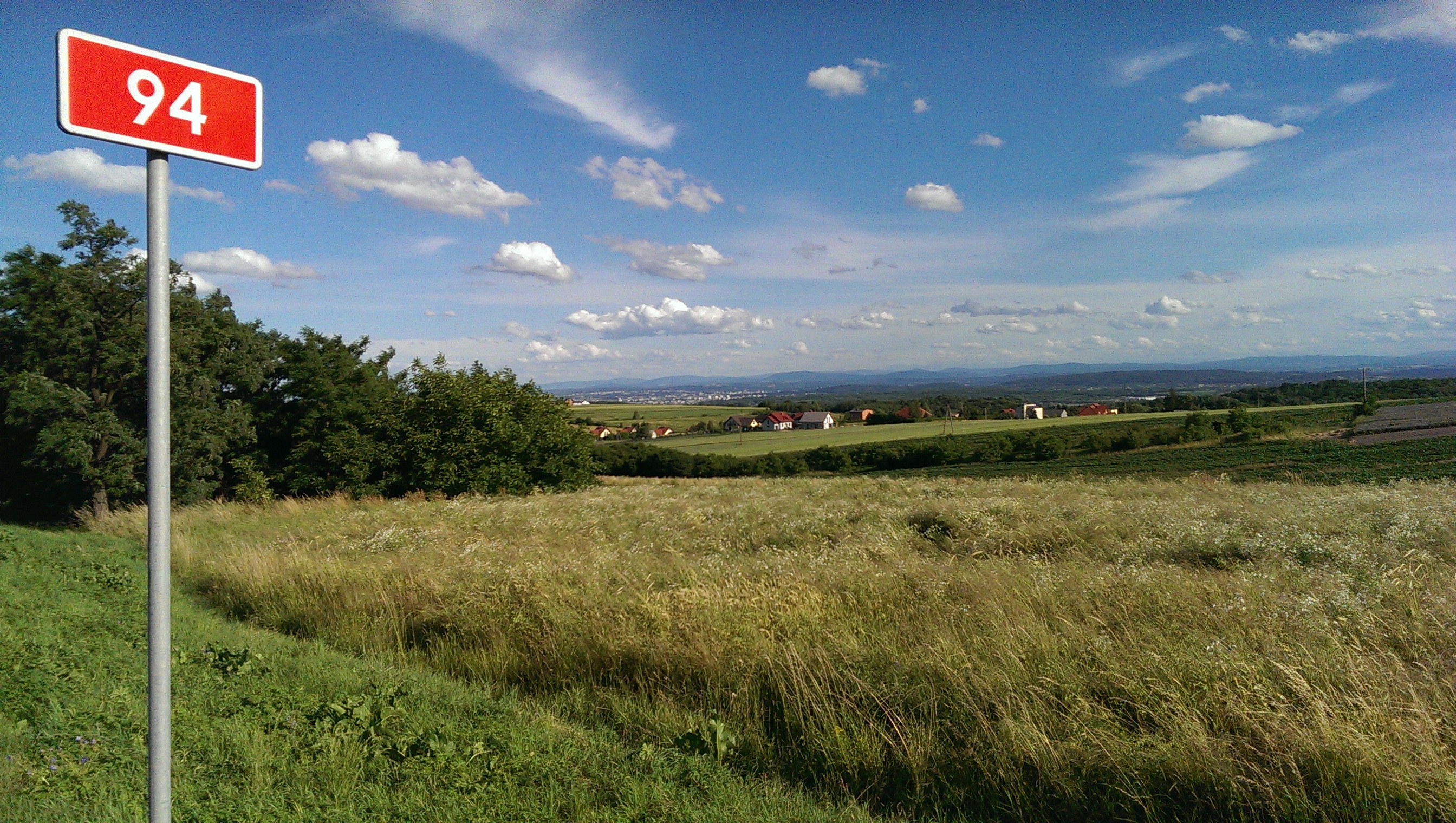
National Road 94 in Wielka Wieś, Lesser Poland Voivodeship

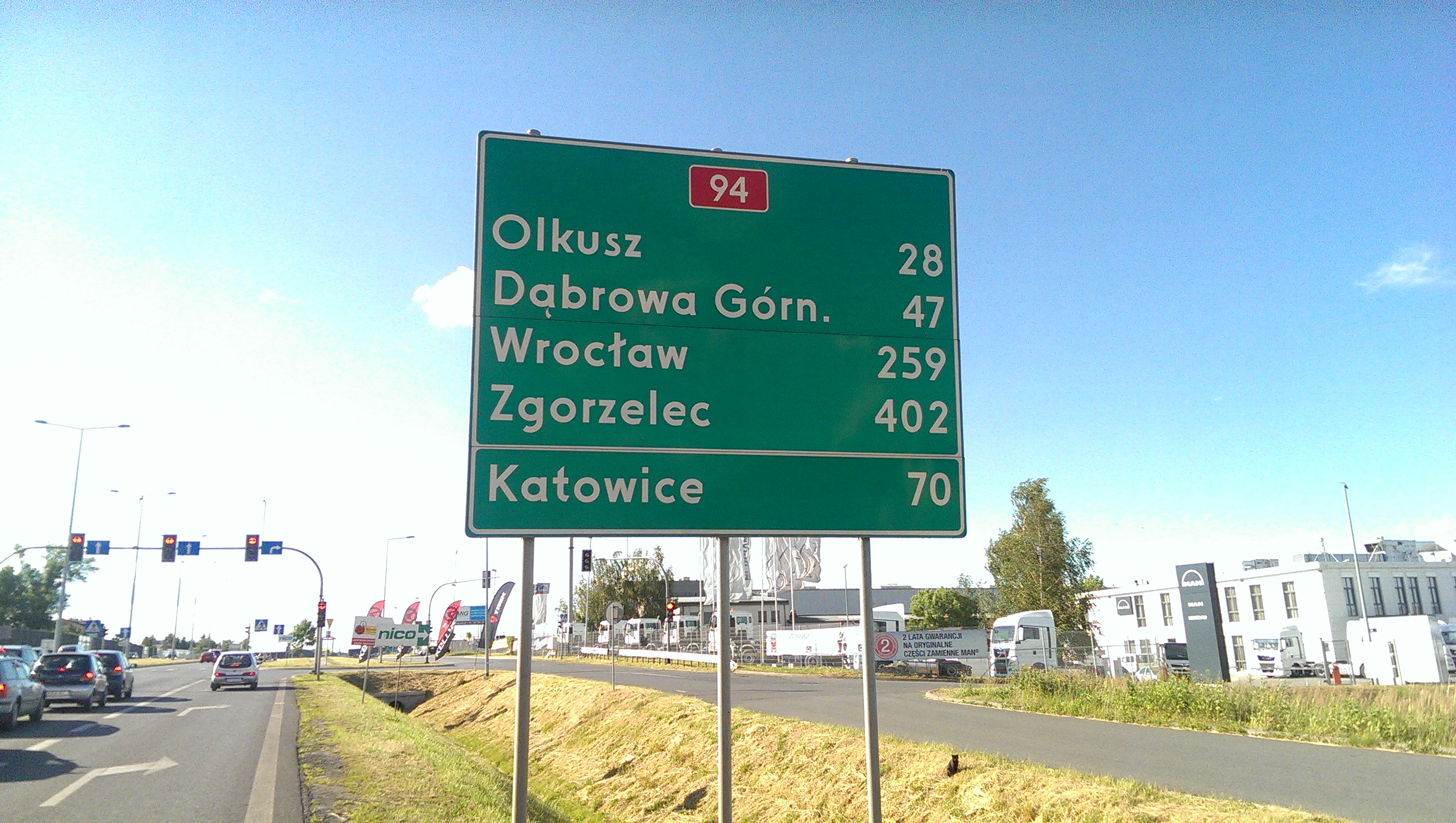
National Road 94 in Modlniczka, Lesser Poland Voivodeship

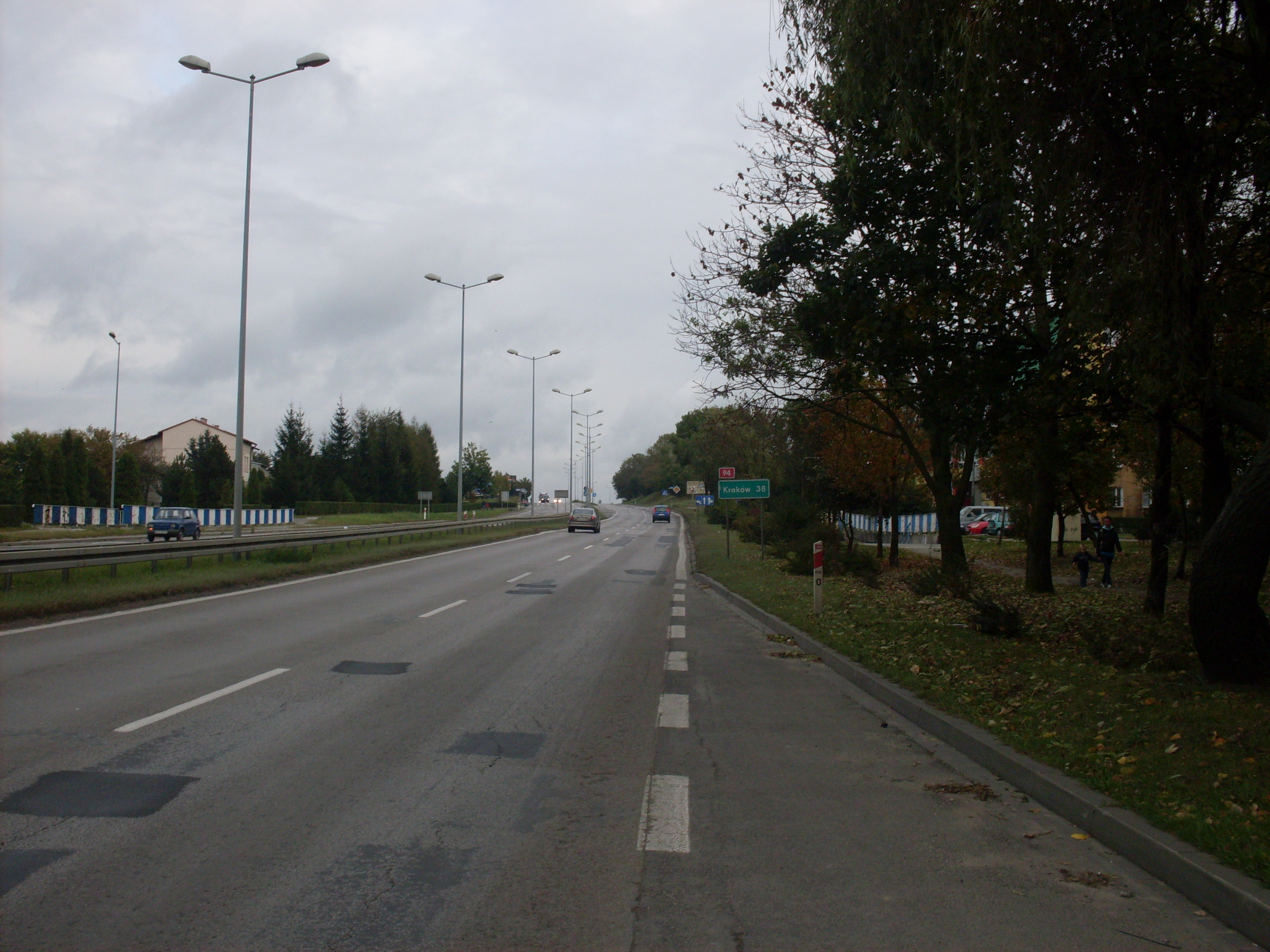
National Road 94 in Olkusz

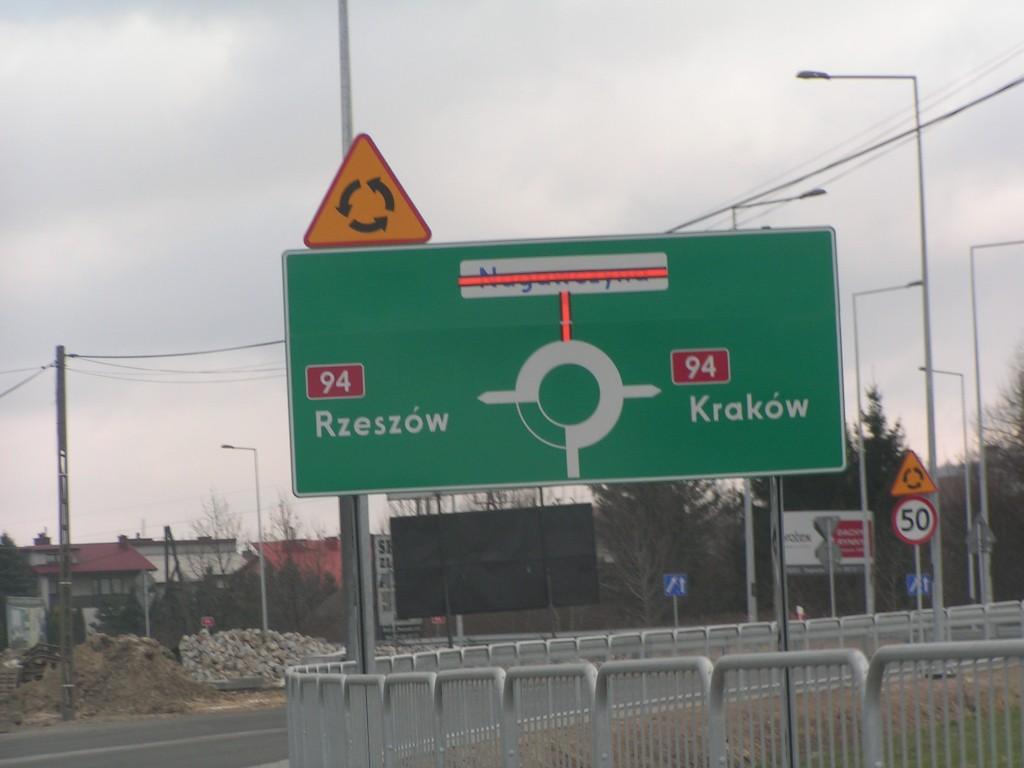
Roundabout in Dębica (DK94)

Junction (Wielicka Street) of National Road 94 with A4 in Kraków

National Road 94 (Polish: Droga krajowa nr 94) is a road in Poland. It runs through 5 voivodeships: Lower Silesian Voivodeship, Opole Voivodeship, Silesian Voivodeship, Lesser Poland Voivodeship and Subcarpathian Voivodeship. It is a road of GP class and partially G class. The road runs as a free alternative route for A4 motorway. National road 94 in large part runs along the old route of national road no. 4 and because of that it is colloquially called the old four by drivers. After the completion of the A4 motorway the formerly parallel-running national road no. 4 has become of secondary importance and serves as a backup route; it can be useful in case of a traffic collision or other source disrupting traffic on the A4.

== History ==
From 1996 to 2001, there were plans to build expressway S94 on route Bielsko-Biała – Żywiec – Zwardoń. In 2000 the national road network was reformed and this section got number 69, which was later built as S69. In 2016 the route was incorporated into S1.

== Sections ==
National road 94, compared to most Polish national roads, has unusual mileage numbers – it's being counted from kilometre zero multiple times, despite the completion of A4 motorway in 2016.

Mileage numbers of national road no. 94
Section	Start km	End km	Notes
Interchange Zgorzelec (A4) – Bolesławiec – Krzywa interchange (A4)	0	≈57,3	former course of national road no. 4
Krzywa interchange (A4) – Legnica, Dziennikarska street	0	≈27,5	Oldest section of the road (got its number in 2000)
Legnica, Dziennikarska street – Leszczyńska street (DW333)	0	≈0,9	Local numbering
Legnica, Leszczyńska street – Wrocław, Milenijna street (DK5)	27,5	92,8	
Wrocław, Powstańców Śląskich street (DK5) – Oława – Karczów (DK46)	97	173	
Karczów (DK46) – Opole-Kolonia Gosławicka (DK46) – Opole-Grudzice	0	18,8	Local numbering on the northern Opole bypass; between Karczów and the DK46/DK94 crossing in Kolonia Gosławicka should be counted within road with the lower number
Opole-Grudzice – Strzelce Opolskie – Pyskowice – Bytom-Karb (DK88)	189,6	263	
Bytom-Karb (DK88) – Piekary Śląskie – Będzin (DK86)	0	≈18,3	
Sosnowiec-Pogoń (DK86) – Dąbrowa Górnicza – border between Silesian and Lesser Poland voivodeships	19	40,8	
Border between Silesian and Lesser Poland voivodeships – Olkusz – Modlnica	285,5	327,9	
Modlnica – Modlniczka interchange (S52, DK7)	0	2,4	Local numbering
Kraków Wieliczka interchange (A4) – Tarnów (DK73) – border between Lesser Poland and Subcarpathian voivodeships	0	88,4	Mileages on the segment shared with DK73 should be numbered within road with the lower number
Border between Lesser Poland and Subcarpathian voivodeships – Pilzno bypass	527,5	534,9	Mileages on the segment shared with DK73 should be numbered within road with the lower number
Pilzno bypass	0	2,5	Local numbering; 1,9 km long segment shared with national road no. 73
Pilzno bypass – Dębica – Ropczyce bypass	538,3	561,3	Renewal of numbering on the terminal point of Pilzno bypass
Ropczyce bypass – Witkowice Górne	0	≈4,5	Local numbering
Witkowice Górne – Sędziszów Małopolski – Świlcza (S19) – Rzeszów (DK97) – Łańcut – Przeworsk – Jarosław bypass	565,4	645	The Rzeszów (DK97) – Łańcut – Przeworsk – Jarosław Zachód interchange (A4) segment is the newest one (got its number in 2016)
Jarosław bypass	0	11,3	Local numbering; 3–11,3 km long segment shared with national road no. 77 should be numbered within road with the lower number
Jarosław bypass – Radymno (DK77) – Korczowa interchange (A4) – road 1698R	655,5	≈686	Section shared with DK77 numbering between 655,5 and 664 km

== Road class ==
The road is a class GP for almost all of its length – with the exception of section from Krzywa interchange to Prochowice, which is of G class.

== Weight limit ==
Since March 13, 2021 the road allows vehicles with weight up to 11,5 tons per single axle.

== Towns and cities along the road ==
Jędrzychowice, Bolesławiec, Krzywa, Chojnów, Legnica, Prochowice, Środa Śląska, Wrocław, Siechnice, Oława, Brzeg, Skorogoszcz, Opole, Walidrogi, Nakło, Izbicko, Strzelce Opolskie, Toszek, Pyskowice, Wieszowa, Zabrze, Bytom, Piekary Śląskie, Siemianowice Śląskie, Czeladź, Będzin, Sosnowiec, Dąbrowa Górnicza, Sławków, Olkusz, Modlniczka, Kraków, Wieliczka, Bochnia, Brzesko, Wojnicz, Tarnów, Pilzno, Dębica, Ropczyce, Sędziszów Małopolski, Świlcza, Rzeszów, Łańcut, Przeworsk, Mirocin, Jarosław, Radymno, Skołoszów, Korczowa
