= General Directorate for National Roads and Motorways =

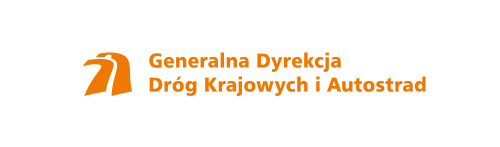

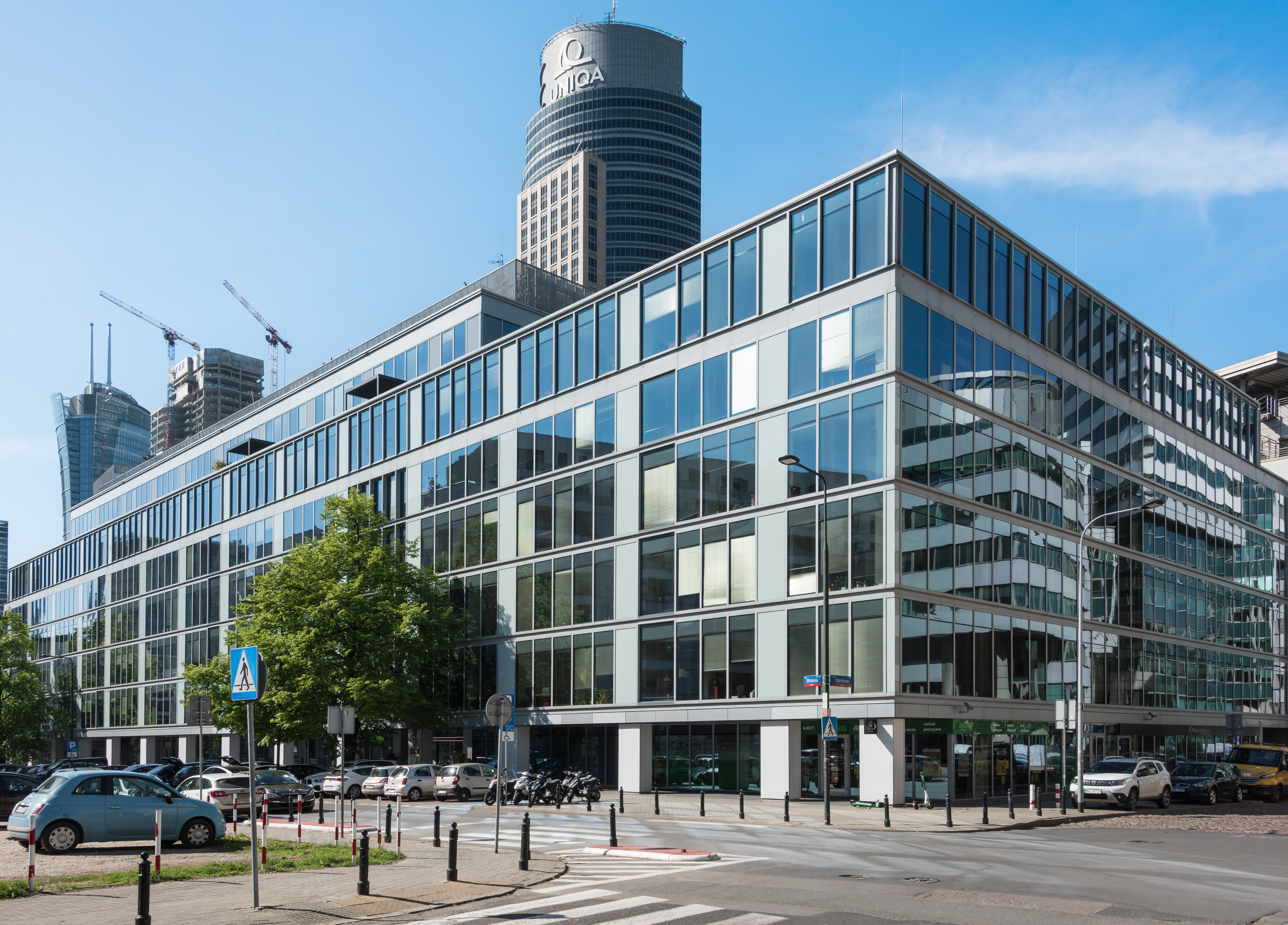
- Company type: Government-owned company
- Industry: Highway authority
- Founded: 1 April 2002
- Headquarters: ul. Wronia 53; 00-874 Warsaw
- Key people: Tomasz Żuchowski (Chairman)
- Owner: Government of Poland
- Number of employees: 4,487 (2017)
- Website: gov.pl/gddkia

The General Directorate for National Roads and Motorways (Polish: Generalna Dyrekcja Dróg Krajowych i Autostrad, GDDKiA) is the central authority of national administration set up to manage the national roads and implementation of the state budget in Poland. The GDDKiA was established on 1 April 2002 by the Polish Ministry of Transportation.

The directorate was formed by a consolidation of the:

- General Directorate for Public Roads (Polish: Generalna Dyrekcja Dróg Publicznych, est. 23 March 1951)
- Public Agency for Construction and the Operations of Motorways (Polish: Agencja Budowy i Eksploatacji Autostrad, est. 8 June 1995).

The head of administration of the GDDKiA is the Director-General of National Roads and Motorways. The GDDKiA consists of 16 provincial branches and also the Regional Country Roads offices, which manage roads in their territories. In addition the Directorate-General of the History of Roads resides in Szczucin, and is responsible for preserving any road monuments.

The GDDKiA is the central government body responsible for national roads and also performs the duties of:

- Participation in the implementation of road transport policy
- Collection of data and information about the network of public roads
- Supervising the preparation of road infrastructure for the defense of the nation
- Issuing permits for a single journey, within a specified time and for a fixed route, of non-standard vehicles
- Cooperating with other road administrations and international organizations
- Cooperation with local governments for the development and maintenance of road infrastructure
- Management of traffic on the national roads
- Protection of road monuments
- Performing the tasks associated with preparing and coordinating the construction and operation of paid motorways
- Managing payment for transit in accordance with the provisions of paid highways and the National Fund for traffic.
