= August Gutzmer =

German mathematician (1860–1924)

Karl Friedrich August Gutzmer
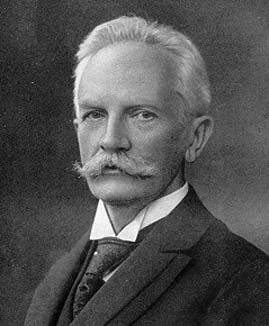
- Born: 2 February 1860; Neu-Roddahn (Neustadt (Dosse), Kingdom of Prussia
- Died: 10 May 1924 (aged 64); Halle, Germany
- Resting place: St. Laurentius cemetery (Halle); 51.490022°N 11.960131°E
- Education: University of Halle
- Known for: Parseval–Gutzmer formula
- Spouse: Helene von Bannasch
- Parent(s): Carl August Friedrich Gutzmer and Wilhelmine Schultze
- Scientific career
- Fields: Mathematics
- Workplaces: Technische Universität Berlin; University of Jena; University of Halle
- Thesis: Über gewisse partielle differentialgleichungen höherer ordnung (1893)
- Doctoral advisor: Albert Wangerin
- Doctoral students: Frieda Nugel

Karl Friedrich August Gutzmer (2 February 1860 – 10 May 1924) was a German mathematician who was chairman of some German commissions about improvement of the teaching of mathematics.

== Life and work ==
Gutzmer was born near Schwerin but his family moved to Berlin when he was eight years old. In Berlin he studied in Friedrichswerdersche Gymnasium till 1881. From 1881 to 1884 he attended mathematics lectures at Berlin University despite not being registered as a student. He graduated in 1887 in Berlin.

He began his academic career publishing five articles in the Portuguese journal Jornal de Sciencias mathematicas e astronomicas (best known as Teixeira's Journal) between 1887 and 1890. In 1893 he was awarded a doctorate submitting at the University of Halle a dissertation about certain partial differential equations. Married in the same year, he left his academic career to manage his wife's lands. In 1894 he returned to teaching at the Technische Hochschule in Charlottenburg (now Technische Universität Berlin) and the following year he obtained his venia legendi at the University of Halle where he taught as assistant professor till 1899.

From 1900 to 1905 he was full professor at the University of Jena. In 1905 he returned to Halle University succeeding Georg Cantor, where he remained till his death in 1924. He was rector of the university (1914–1915), chairman of the German Committee for Mathematical and Scientific Teaching (1908–1913), member of the Academy of Sciences Leopoldina from 1900 and his president from 1922 to 1924. At the International Congress of Mathematicians he was an invited speaker in 1904 in Heidelberg and in 1908 in Rome.

Gutzmer published more than forty works; among them, the reports about the activities of the teaching committee are specially relevant. He also wrote a history of the German Mathematical Society.

== Bibliography ==
- Daum, Andreas. Wissenschaftspopularisierung im 19. Jahrhundert: Bürgerliche Kultur, naturwissenschaftliche Bildung und die deutsche Öffentlichkeit, 1848–1914. Munich: Oldenbourg, 1998, ISBN 3-486-56337-8.
- Klein, Felix (2016). Elementary Mathematics from a Higher Standpoint. Springer. ISBN 978-3-662-49440-0.
- Malonek, Helmuth R.; Kharlamova, Vera I. (2010). "It all began with publications in Teixeira´s Journal: some remarks on August Gutzmer". CIDMA – Centro de Investigação e Desenvolvimento Em Matemática e Aplicações. University of Aveiro. hdl:10773/8416.
