= Andrzej Tychowski =

Polish footballer

Personal information
- Full name: Andrzej Tychowski
- Date of birth: 5 October 1981 (age 45)
- Place of birth: Żary, Poland
- Height: 1.88 m (6 ft 2 in)
- Position: Centre-back

Team information
- Current team: Stal Szczecin (manager)

Senior career*
Years	Team	Apps	(Gls)
1998–2000	Promień Żary		
2000–2001	Zryw Zielona Góra		
2002–2005	Promień Żary		
2005–2006	KSZO Ostrowiec	34	(3)
2006–2007	Widzew Łódź	11	(1)
2007	Drøbak-Frogn IL		
2008–2009	Pogoń Szczecin		
2009	Hutnik Szczecin		
2010–2011	GKS Mierzyn		
2012	Hutnik Szczecin		
2020–2023	Sztorm Szczecin	20	(14)

Managerial career
- 2010–2011: Mierzynianka Mierzyn
- 2011–2014: Hutnik Szczecin
- 2014–2016: Chemik Police
- 2016–2018: Pogoń Szczecin (youth)
- 2018–2019: Pogoń Szczecin II
- 2019–2022: Świt Skolwin
- 2022–: Stal Szczecin
- * Club domestic league appearances and goals

Andrzej Tychowski (born 5 August 1981) is a Polish professional football manager and former player who played as a centre-back. He is currently in charge of Stal Szczecin, and serves as the club's chairman.

== Honours ==
=== Player ===
Pogoń Szczecin

- IV liga West Pomerania: 2007–08

Sztorm Szczecin

- Klasa B West Pomerania II: 2021–22

=== Managerial ===
Świt Skolwin

- Polish Cup (West Pomerania regionals): 2019–20, 2020–21
