= Georg Bohlmann =

German mathematician (1869–1928)

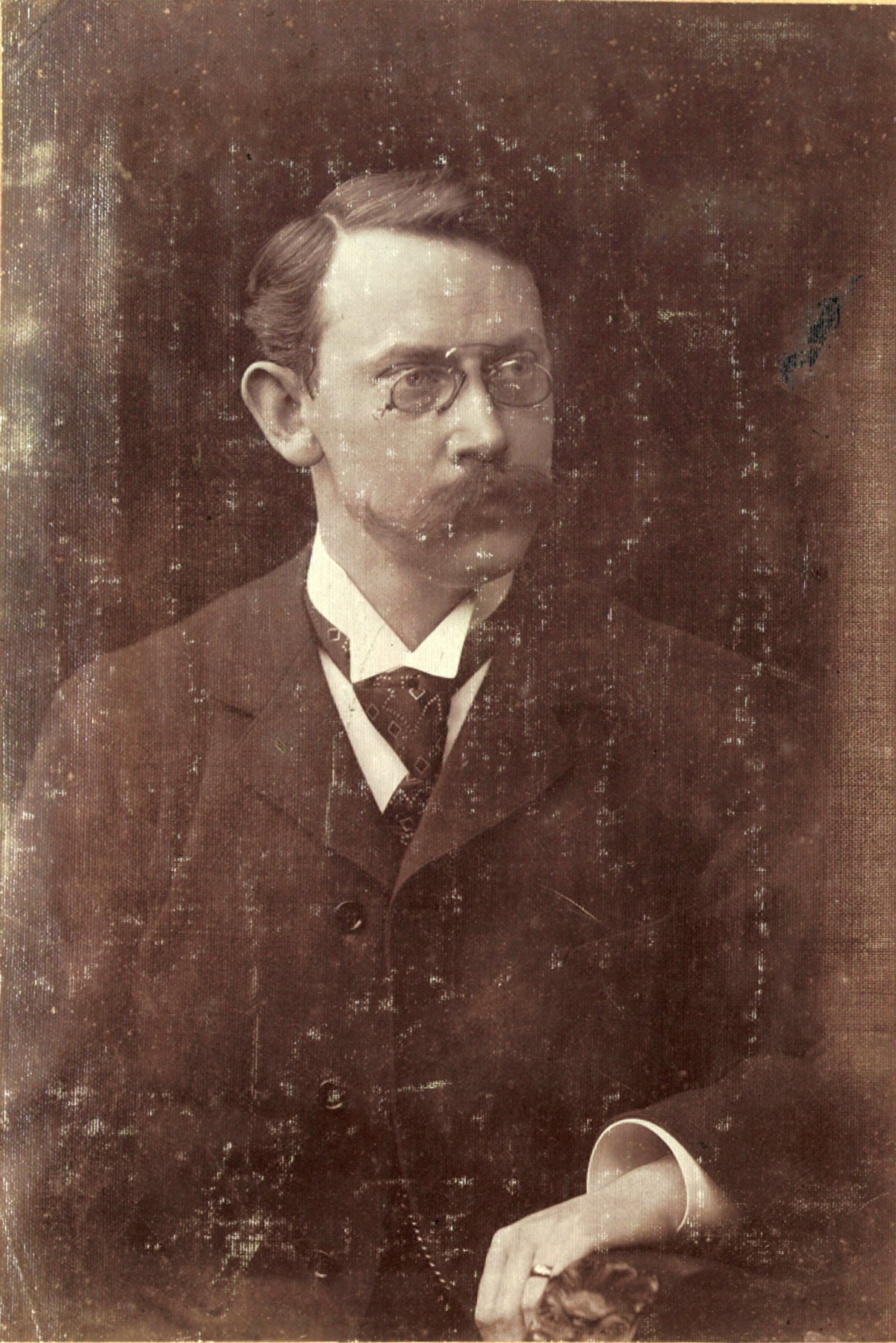
- Born: 23 April 1869; Berlin, Prussia
- Died: 25 April 1928 (aged 59); Berlin, Germany
- Education: University of Berlin; University of Halle
- Scientific career
- Fields: Probability theory Actuarial mathematics
- Workplaces: Meteorological Institute of Berlin; University of Göttingen; New York Mutual Life Insurance Company
- Thesis: Ueber eine gewisse Klasse continuirlicher Gruppen und ihren Zusammenhang mit den Additionstheoremen ("On a certain class of continuous groups and their relation to addition theorems") (1892)
- Doctoral advisor: Albert Wangerin

Georg Bohlmann (23 April 1869 – 25 April 1928) was a German mathematician who specialized in probability theory and actuarial mathematics.

== Life and career ==
Georg Bohlmann went to school in Berlin and Leipzig and took his Abitur at the Wilhelms-Gymnasium in Berlin in 1888. After that, he began studying mathematics at the University of Berlin under Leopold Kronecker, Lazarus Fuchs, and Wilhelm Dilthey. As he advanced in his studies, Lie groups became the focus of his interest. Since this area was poorly represented at Berlin, he moved to the University of Halle, where he obtained his doctorate in 1892 under Albert Wangerin with a dissertation on the topic Ueber eine gewisse Klasse continuierlicher Gruppen und ihren Zusammenhang mit den Additionstheoremen ("On a certain class of continuous groups and their relation to addition theorems"). After that, he worked at the Meteorological Institute of Berlin, where presumably his interest in applied mathematics developed. At the invitation of Felix Klein, he moved to the University of Göttingen, where he habilitated in 1894. In 1895, he was involved in starting a seminar on actuarial science at Göttingen. However, since he held no permanent position there, he went to Berlin in 1903 to work as the Chief Actuary for the German subsidiary of the New York Mutual Life Insurance Company.

In 1901, he wrote the entry on life insurance mathematics in the Enzyklopädie der mathematischen Wissenschaften ("Encyclopaedia of Mathematical Sciences") in which he gave axioms for probability theory long before Andrey Kolmogorov did so in 1933. In particular, he was the first to give the modern definition of statistical independence. Compared to the current structure of probability theory, his work only lacked the technical condition of sigma additivity. However, in contrast to Kolmogorov, Bohlmann failed to prove significant theorems within his axiomatic framework. As a result, his fundamental contributions to probability theory gained very little attention. In particular, though Kolmogorov had visited Göttingen several times in the late 1920s, he had no knowledge of Bohlmann's work.

Bohlmann was an invited speaker in the International Congress of Mathematicians in 1908 at Rome.

== Publications ==
- Lebensversicherungsmathematik (Life Insurance Mathematics), Enzyklopädie der Mathematischen Wissenschaften, 1901
- Continuierliche Gruppen von quadratischen Transformationen der Ebene (Continuous groups of quadratic transformations of the plane), Göttinger Nachrichten, 1896, pp. 44–54
- Ein Ausgleichungsproblem (A stabilization problem), Göttinger Nachrichten, 1899, pp. 260–271
- Die Grundbegriffe der Wahrscheinlichkeitsrechnung in ihrer Anwendung auf die Lebensversicherung (The basic concepts of probability theory and its applications to life insurance), Atti del IV Congresso internazionale dei Matematici III, Rome 1909, pp. 244–278
- Anthropometrie und Lebensversicherung (Anthropometry and life insurance), Zeitschrift für die gesamte Versicherungs-Wissenschaft 14, 1914, pp. 743–786
