= German National Academy of Sciences Leopoldina =

National academy of Germany

German National Academy of Natural Sciences Leopoldina
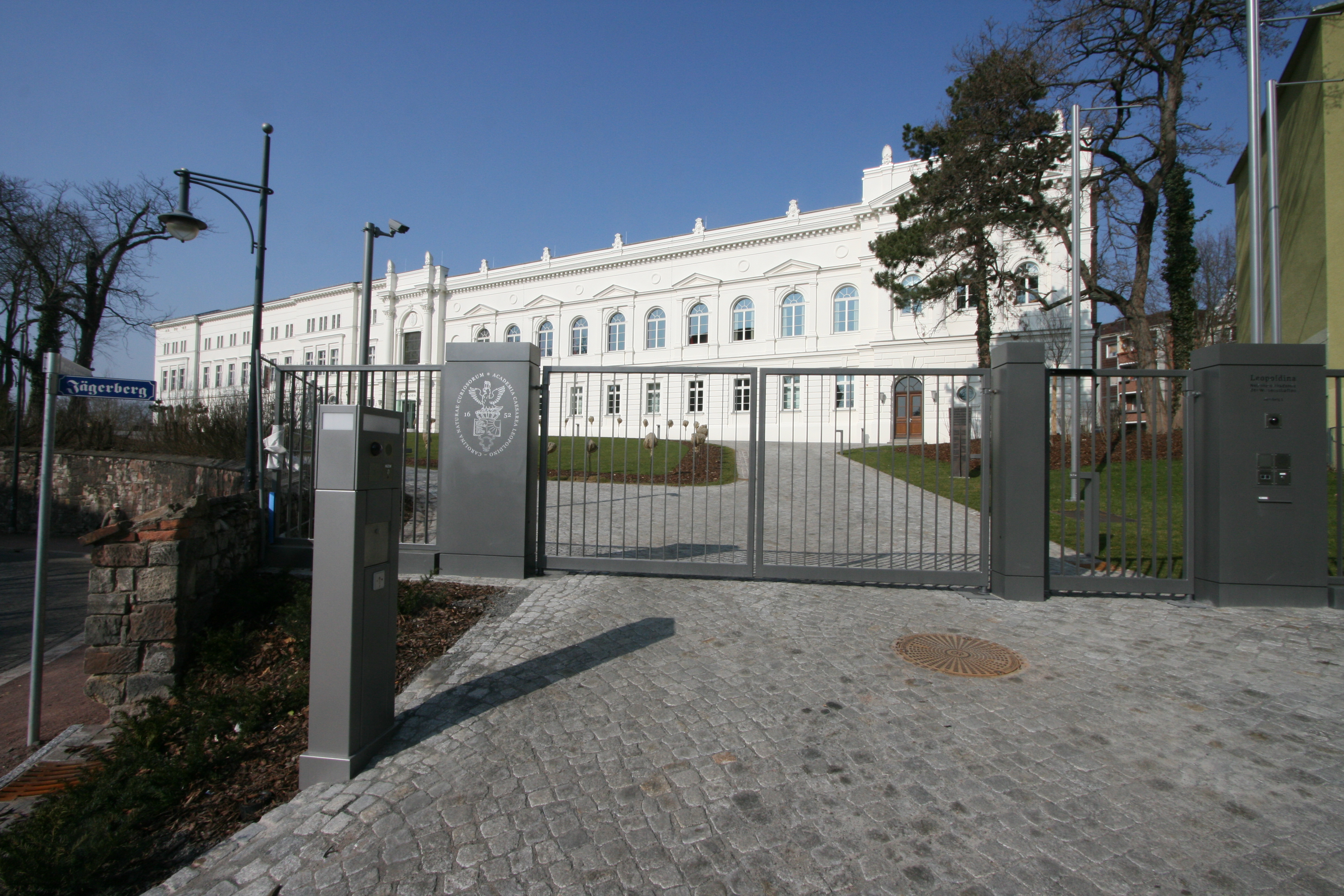
- Main building of Leopoldina in Halle
- Founded: 1 January 1652; 374 years ago
- Founders: Johann Laurentius Bausch; Johann Michael Fehr; Georg Balthasar Metzger; Georg Balthasar Wohlfarth
- Type: National academy (since 2008)
- Location: Halle, Germany
- Coordinates: 51°29′15″N 11°57′48″E
- Services: Scholarships, awards, consultation, research
- Fields: Science, academics
- Members: 1,600 members
- Key people: Bettina Rockenbach (President)
- Website: leopoldina.org

The German National Academy of Sciences Leopoldina (German: Deutsche Akademie der Naturforscher Leopoldina – Nationale Akademie der Wissenschaften), in short Leopoldina, is the national academy of Germany, and is located in Halle (Saale). Founded on 1 January 1652, based on academic models in Italy, it was originally named the Academia Naturae Curiosorum until 1687 when Emperor Leopold I raised it to an academy and named it after himself. It was since known under the German name Deutsche Akademie der Naturforscher Leopoldina until 2007, when it was declared to be Germany's National Academy of Sciences from the next year onward.

== History ==
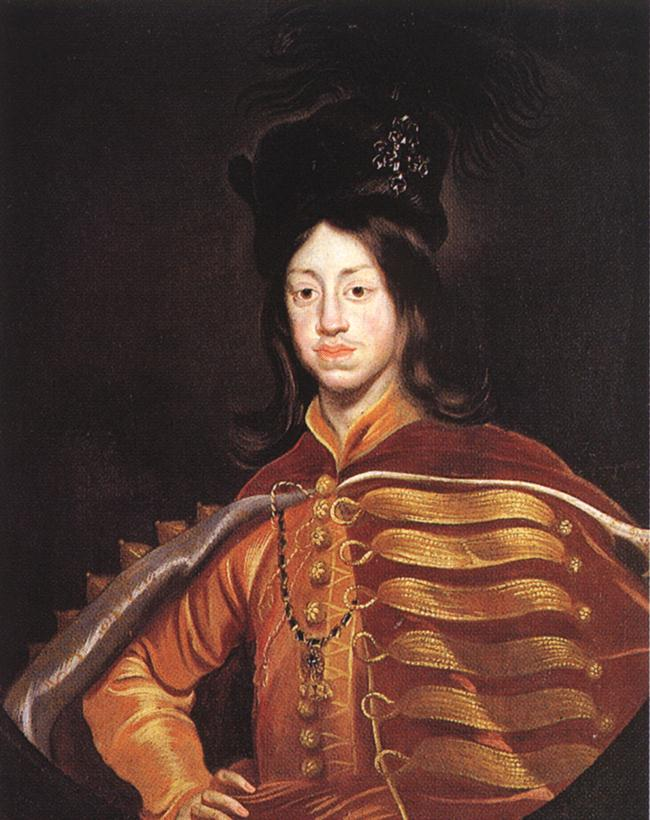
Leopold I of the Holy Roman Empire

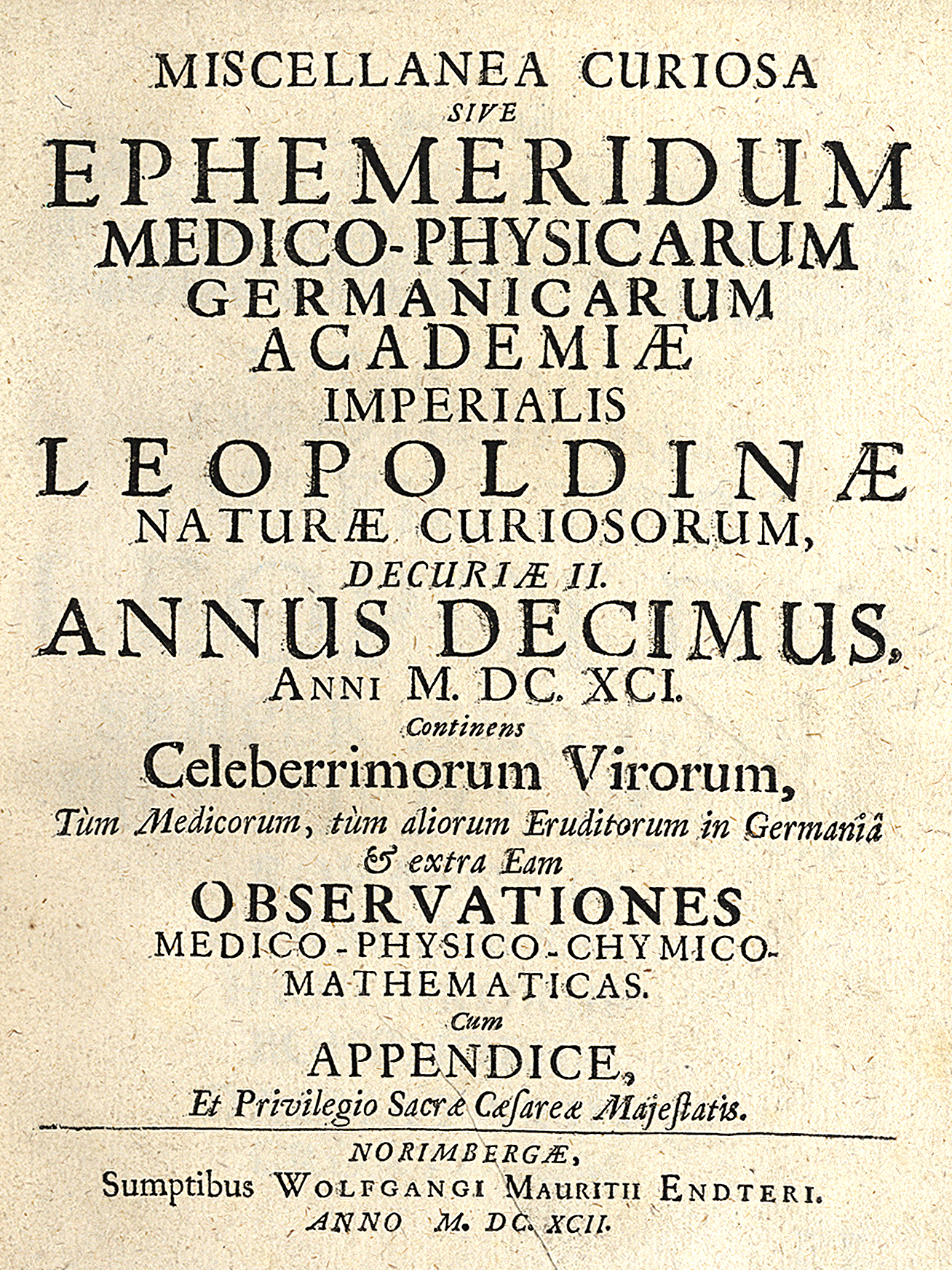
Miscellanea Curiosa (1692)

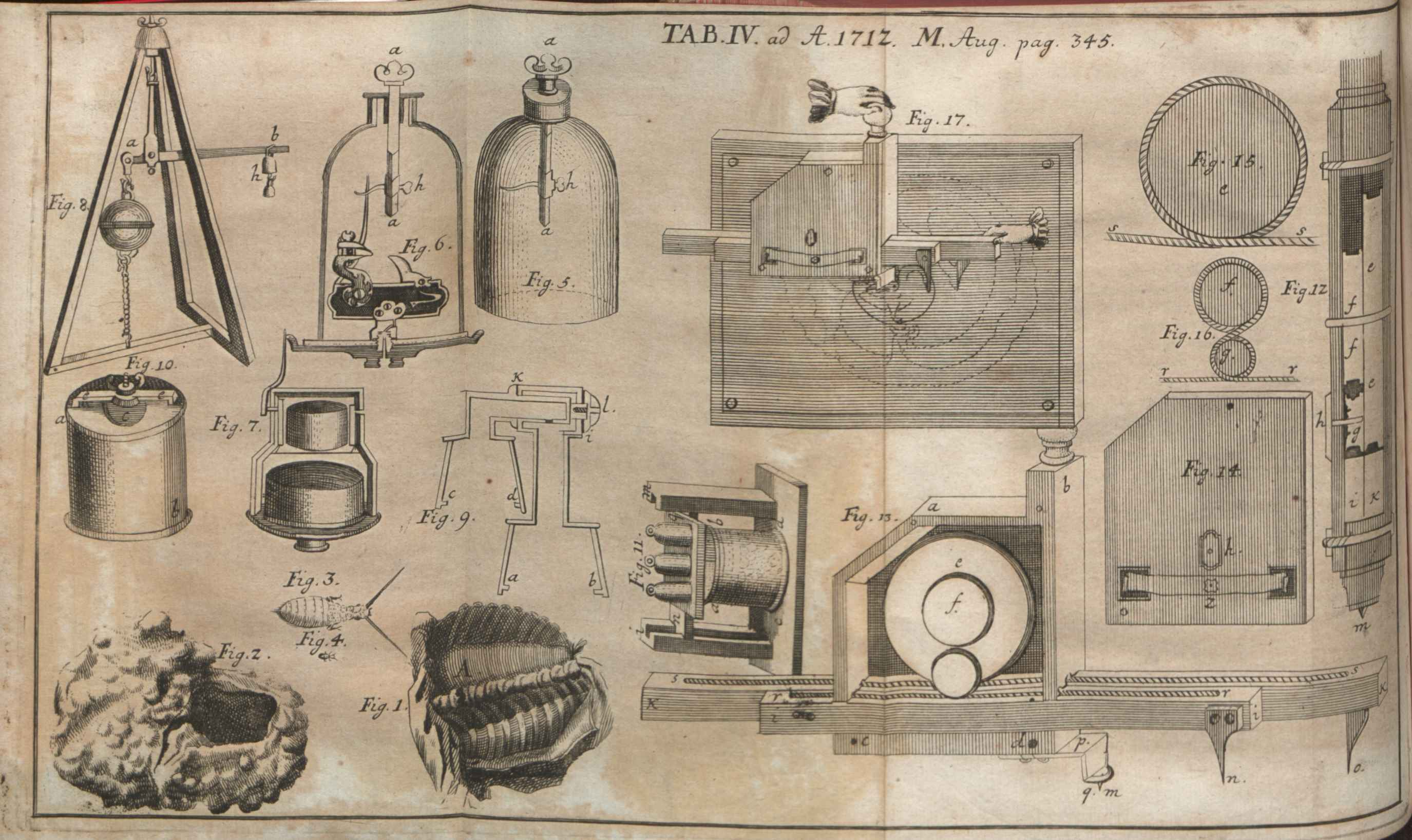
An illustration of the Acta Eruditorum of 1712 where the Naturae Curiosorum Ephemerides were published

The Leopoldina was founded in the imperial city of Schweinfurt on 1 January 1652 under the Latin name Academia Naturae Curiosorum, sometimes translated into English as "Academy of the Curious as to Nature." It was founded by four local physicians – Johann Laurentius Bausch, the first president of the society, Johann Michael Fehr, Georg Balthasar Metzger, and Georg Balthasar Wohlfarth; and was the only academy like it at the time making it the oldest academy of science in Germany. The archives of Leopoldina are some of the oldest in the world based on the fact that the records date back to the 17th century. These records provide a window into the German sciences of the last 350 years.

In 1670, the society began to publish the Ephemeriden or Miscellanea Curiosa, one of the earliest scientific journals and one which had a particularly strong focus on medicine and related aspects of natural philosophy, such as botany and physiology.^{, pp. 7–8} It was recognized by Emperor Leopold I who raised it to an academy in 1677, and then declared it an Imperial Academy in 1687, naming it Sacri Romani Imperii Academia Caesareo-Leopoldina Naturae Curiosorum and allowing it to carry his name.

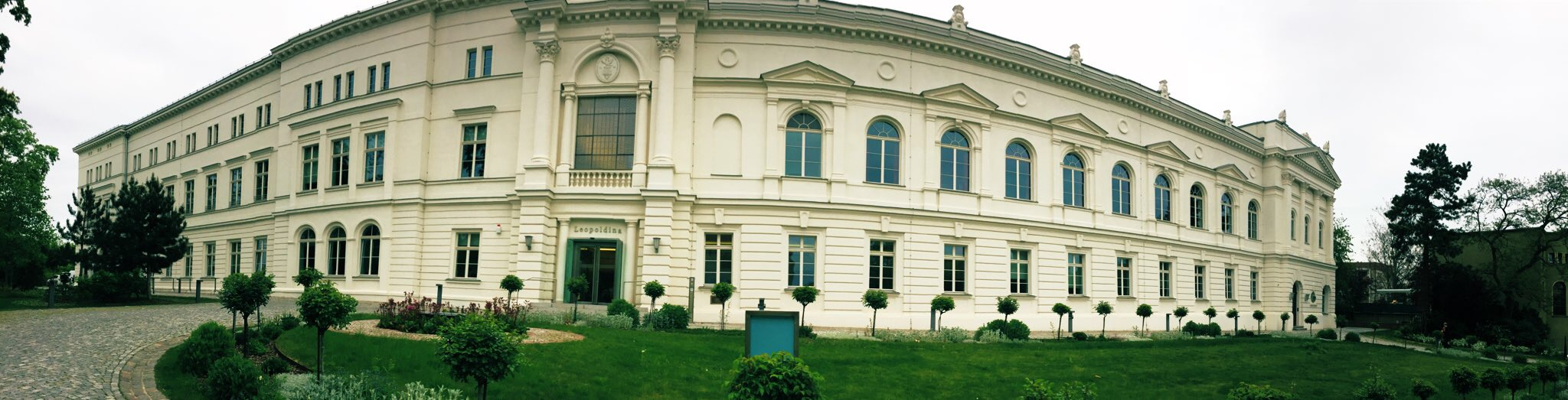
German National Academy of Sciences Leopoldina

At first, the society conducted its business by correspondence and was located wherever the president was working.^{, pp. 8–9} After Schweinfurt, the Academy was rooted in many places before it was permanently located in Halle in 1878. Following Schweinfurt in chronological order: Nuremberg, Augsburg, Altdorf, Erfurt, Halle, Nuremberg, Erlangen, Bonn, Breslau (currently Wrocław, Poland), Jena, Dresden, and finally Halle.^{, pp. 8–9}There were many efforts during years of national prosperity to elevate the Academy to the status of a 'national institute,' but all such early efforts failed. In those times the Academy was not on the nation's agenda at a political or academic level. Later, however, its members began to enrich the Academy with an obligation to be present at its proceedings so as to improve their public standing. Thus they began to hold regular monthly meetings, even in the challenging conditions of 1924,^{, pp. 8–9} which had to be attended by all local members.

When Adolf Hitler became Germany's Chancellor in 1933, the Leopoldina started to exclude its Jewish members. Albert Einstein was the first victim because of public pressure. In 1938 there followed a declaration to the Nazi government that all Jewish members had been excluded, while in reality the index cards of around 70 members were simply hidden behind a curtain, no official member lists were published any more, and the cards were reintegrated one day after the German capitulation. Eight of them were murdered by the Nazis over the course of World War II. Nevertheless, the Leopoldina did not suffer as much influence from the Nazi regime as other German academies, thanks to the president of the Leopoldina at the time, Emil Abderhalden. While Jewish members were 'officially' expelled, the president of the Leopoldina made sure it did not go to the lengths that other academies went to at the time, the expelled did not even get a notification about the matter, still received the member magazines and were not exposed in public by any statement of the society. Abderhalden resisted Nazi pressure by reorganizing Sections of the Academy and introducing a new series 'Biographies of German Natural Scientists' in 1932.

After World War II, Halle became part of East Germany. During this time, the German Democratic Republic shut down all societies, leading the members of the Leopoldina to meet unofficially and in private. Efforts were made to reestablish the Academy, however. An edition of Goethe's 'The Works of Science' began to be edited under the Academy's name in 1947, and lectures started again in 1948. However, the Academy was not officially reopened until 1952. This reopening came just in time for the Academy to celebrate its tercentenary.

After reopening, the Leopoldina successfully resisted attempts from the German Democratic Republic to reconstitute the Academy as a specifically East German institute and continued to think of itself as an institution for the whole of Germany. This was greatly affected by the building of the Berlin Wall in August 1961. The Academy was able to stay independent of national politics, which allowed it to bridge East and West Germany through scientific ideas. The yearly meeting of the Academy was planned for October of that year in West Germany; invitations had been sent out in June announcing that they would be discussing energy; but less than two months later letters of cancellation were sent out, stating that members living in the GDR would not be given permission to travel.

In 1991, after German reunification, the Leopoldina was granted the status of a non-profit organisation. It is funded jointly by the German government and the government of the state of Saxony-Anhalt.^{, pp. 10–14} A new section was also created for the history of culture with the emphasis on medicine and the natural sciences.

In November 2007, German science minister Annette Schavan announced the renaming of the Leopoldina to "German Academy of Sciences" (Deutsche Akademie der Wissenschaften), and said that "due to its international prestige, the Leopoldina is predestined to represent Germany within the circle of international academies." Karsten Jedlitschka says that the Academy was named the first national science Academy in Germany in February 2008. As the German Academy of Sciences, it is a counterpart to the rights and responsibilities of institutions such as Britain's Royal Society and the United States' National Academy of Sciences. As the national academy, the Leopoldina will act as a consulting service on matters of science and science related policy for the German government, including parliament and social and political organizations.

== Activities ==
The Leopoldina is the first and foremost academic society in Germany to advise the German government on a variety of scientific matters, for instance on climate change and disease control.

The Leopoldina gives conferences and lectures and continues to publish the Ephemeriden under the name Nova Acta Leopoldina. It issues various medals and awards, offers grants and scholarships and elects new members to itself. The Academy also maintains a library and an archive and it also researches its own history and publishes another journal, Acta Historica Leopoldina devoted to this subject.^{, pp. 15–33}

Consistently with its national preeminence, it also collaborates extensively with other learned societies in international exchanges of ideas and policy recommendations. Details of such initiatives are included on its multilingual website.

== Honours ==
Apart from being a fellow, excellence can also be rewarded by receiving one of the following honours:

- Honorary membership
- Cothenius Medal (first awarded in 1792)
- Carus Medal (first awarded in 1896)
- Schleiden Medal (first awarded in 1955)
- Mendel Medal (since 1965, in honour of Gregor Mendel)
- Darwin Badge (only awarded in 1959 – the centenary of the publication of On the Origin of Species)
- Leopoldina Prize for Junior Scientists
- Georg Uschmann Prize for History of Science
- Leopoldina Research Prize (since 2001, funded by the Commerzbank Foundation)
- Thieme Prize of the Leopoldina for Medicine
- Medal of Merit (awarded by the Presidium only on special occasions)
- Greve Prize (first awarded in 2022)

== Membership ==
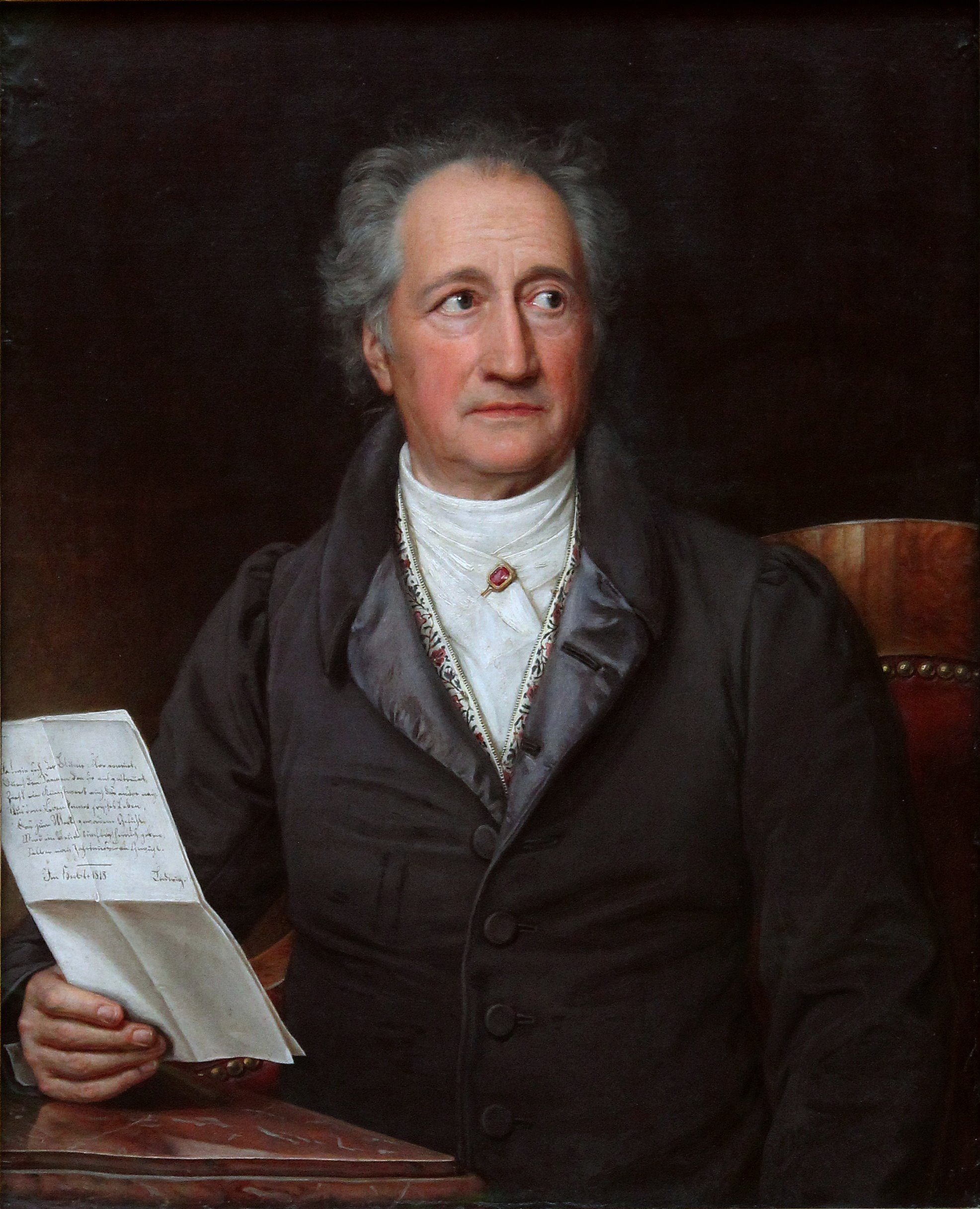
Johann Wolfgang von Goethe

Three quarters of the members are from German-speaking countries (Germany, Austria, Switzerland) and one quarter from about 30 other nations. The election to membership of the Leopoldina is the highest academic honour awarded by an institution in Germany. Some laureates are also fellows of the Leopoldina.

Among the fellows are for instance:

- Christian Ludwig Brehm
- Adolf Butenandt
- James B. Conant
- Katayoon Dehesh
- Manfred Eigen
- Albert Einstein (excluded 1933 for being Jewish)
- Gerhard Ertl
- Johann Wolfgang von Goethe
- Ernst Haeckel
- Otto Hahn
- Theodor W. Hänsch
- Paula Hertwig
- Joseph Lister
- Alexander Oparin
- Wilhelm Ostwald
- Max Planck
- Carl Friedrich von Weizäcker

Members might also attribute discoveries and success to the academy. For example, the asteroid 893 Leopoldina is named in its honour.

== Leadership ==
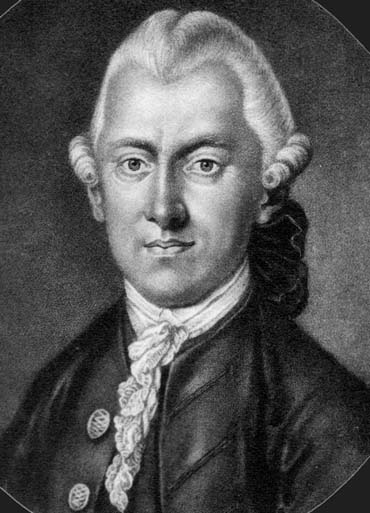
Johann Christian Daniel von Schreber

At the head of the Academy there is a Presidium, elected by the Senate, consisting of the President, acting as the chair, four Vice Presidents, and other members at large. These position terms are five years long and can only be held twice by the same person. The Senate of the Academy currently consists of 39 members representing different sections and disciplines of science, as well as representatives from Switzerland and Austria. Senate members serve for four years and can only be re-elected once. The latest President of the Academy, Bettina Rockenbach, became the Academy's 28th president when she took office on 1 March 2025. Bettina Rockenbach is the first woman to lead the Academy.

Presidents of the Leopoldina with time and place of office:

- 1652–1665 Johann Lorenz Bausch (Schweinfurt)
- 1666–1686 Johann Michael Fehr (Schweinfurt)
- 1686–1693 Johann Georg Volckamer (Nürnberg)
- 1693–1730 Lukas Schröck (Augsburg)
- 1730–1735 Johann Jakob Baier (Altdorf bei Nürnberg)
- 1735–1769 Andreas Elias von Büchner (Erfurt, Halle)
- 1770–1788 Ferdinand Jakob Baier (Nürnberg)
- 1788–1791 Heinrich Friedrich Delius (Erlangen)
- 1791–1810 Johann Christian Daniel von Schreber (Erlangen)
- 1811–1818 Friedrich von Wendt (Erlangen)
- 1818–1858 Christian Gottfried Daniel Nees von Esenbeck (Erlangen, Bonn, Breslau)
- 1858–1862 Dietrich Georg Kieser (Jena)
- 1862–1869 Carl Gustav Carus (Dresden)
- 1870–1878 Wilhelm Friedrich Behn (Dresden)
- 1878–1895 Hermann Knoblauch (since then: Halle)
- 1895–1906 Karl von Fritsch (Halle)
- 1906–1921 Albert Wangerin (Halle)
- 1921–1924 August Gutzmer (Halle)
- 1924–1931 Johannes Walther (Halle)
- 1932–1950 Emil Abderhalden (Halle, Zürich)
- 1952–1953 Otto Schlüter (Halle)
- 1954–1974 Kurt Mothes (Halle)
- 1974–1990 Heinz Bethge (Halle)
- 1990–2003 Benno Parthier (Halle)
- 2003–2010 Volker ter Meulen (Halle)
- 2010–2020 Jörg Hacker (Halle)
- 2020–2025 Gerald Haug (Halle)
- 2025–present Bettina Rockenbach (Halle)

== See also ==
- Acatech – German's national academy of science and engineering
