= Andrzej Niedzielan =

Polish footballer (born 1979)

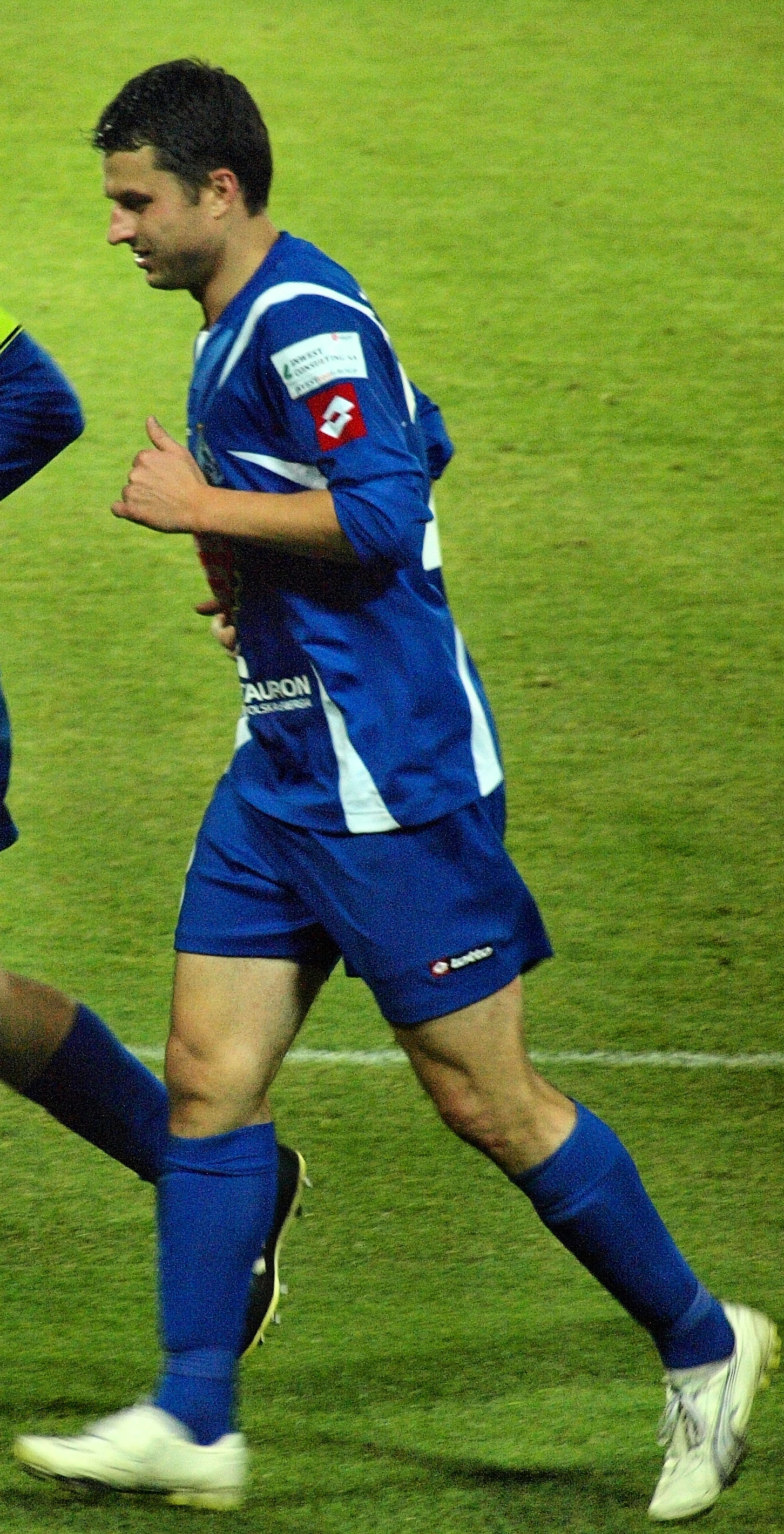
- Niedzielan with Ruch Chorzów in 2009

Personal information
- Date of birth: 27 February 1979 (age 47)
- Place of birth: Żary, Poland
- Height: 1.80 m (5 ft 11 in)
- Positions: Forward; second striker

Youth career
- Promień Żary

Senior career*
Years	Team	Apps	(Gls)
1997–1998	Promień Żary		
1998–2001	Zagłębie Lubin	15	(4)
1999–2000	→ Odra Opole (loan)	22	(3)
2000–2001	→ Chrobry Głogów (loan)	16	(5)
2001–2003	Górnik Zabrze	22	(18)
2003–2004	Dyskobolia Grodzisk Wielkopolski	26	(10)
2004–2007	NEC	87	(24)
2007–2009	Wisła Kraków	24	(1)
2009–2010	Ruch Chorzów	18	(7)
2010–2011	Korona Kielce	25	(12)
2011–2012	Cracovia	14	(1)
2012–2014	Ruch Chorzów	14	(1)

International career
2002–2010	Poland	19	(5)
- * Club domestic league appearances and goals

Andrzej Niedzielan (Polish pronunciation: [ˈandʐɛj ɲɛˈdʑɛlan]; born 27 February 1979) is a Polish former professional footballer who played as a striker.

== Club career ==
Born in Żary, Niedzielan began his career began in 1997, when he joined Promień Żary. Then he played for Zagłębie Lubin, where he did not impress. He made his Ekstraklasa debut in a 0–2 defeat to Ruch Chorzów on 23 September 1998, and on 23 October that year, he scored two goals in a 3–1 victory over Stomil Olsztyn. He finished the 1998–99 season with three goals in eight league appearances. After that season, he was loaned to Odra Opole, and subsequently to Chrobry Głogów.

In the spring of 2001, he was transferred to Górnik Zabrze for a nominal fee. At Górnik, Niedzielan finally found his stride. After playing for one-and-a-half seasons, he was transferred to Dyskobolia Grodzisk. At Dyskobolia his career took off, and after one year, he received an offer from NEC. After three years at NEC, Niedzielan returned to Poland with Wisła Kraków for two seasons. On 24 July 2009, he signed a contract with Ruch Chorzów. He made his debut for Ruch in a match against Wisła Kraków on 1 August 2009. He scored his first goal for the new club in a 2–0 victory over Polonia Warsaw on 29 August. On 6 March 2010, he suffered a zygomatic bone injury.

In June 2010, Niedzielan signed a two-year contract with Ekstraklasa side Korona Kielce. He scored his first goal on 7 August in a debut against Zagłębie Lubin. He also scored in the next league matches against Widzew Łódź, Polonia Bytom, Cracovia, Polonia Warsaw, Wisła Kraków and Ruch Chorzów. After 18 rounds, he was the leading goalscorer of Ekstraklasa with ten goals.

In July 2011, he signed a one-year contract with Cracovia. In January 2012, Niedzielan left Cracovia after having his contract terminated by mutual consent before rejoining Ruch Chorzów. On 8 April 2014, he unilaterally terminated his contract and retired from football shortly after.

== Personal life ==
In June 2007, Niedzielan married Kamila.

== Career statistics ==
=== Club ===
Appearances and goals by club, season and competition
Club	Season	League			Ref.
Club	Season	Division	Apps	Goals	Ref.
Zagłębie Lubin	1998–99	Ekstraklasa	8	3	
Zagłębie Lubin	2000–01	Ekstraklasa	0	0	
Zagłębie Lubin	2001–02	Ekstraklasa	7	1	
Zagłębie Lubin	Total		15	4	–
Odra Opole (loan)	1999–2000	II liga	22	3	
Chrobry Głogów (loan)	2000–01	III liga	16	5	
Górnik Zabrze	2001–02	Ekstraklasa	8	3	
Górnik Zabrze	2002–03	Ekstraklasa	14	15	
Górnik Zabrze	Total		22	18	–
Dyskobolia Grodzisk Wielkopolski	2002–03	Ekstraklasa	14	6	
Dyskobolia Grodzisk Wielkopolski	2003–04	Ekstraklasa	12	4	
Dyskobolia Grodzisk Wielkopolski	Total		26	10	–
NEC	2003–04	Eredivisie	11	3	
NEC	2004–05	Eredivisie	27	5	
NEC	2005–06	Eredivisie	27	10	
NEC	2006–07	Eredivisie	22	2	
NEC	Total		87	24	–
Wisła Kraków	2007–08	Ekstraklasa	8	1	
Wisła Kraków	2008–09	Ekstraklasa	16	0	
Wisła Kraków	Total		24	1	–
Ruch Chorzów	2009–10	Ekstraklasa	18	7	
Korona Kielce	2010–11	Ekstraklasa	25	12	
Cracovia	2011–12	Ekstraklasa	14	1	
Ruch Chorzów	2011–12	Ekstraklasa	5	0	
Ruch Chorzów	2012–13	Ekstraklasa	9	1	
Ruch Chorzów	Total		14	1	–
Career total			283	82	–

=== International ===
Scores and results list Poland's goal tally first, score column indicates score after each Niedzielan goal.

List of international goals scored by Andrzej Niedzielan
No.	Date	Venue	Opponent	Score	Result	Competition
1	14 February 2003	Stadion Poljud, Split, Croatia	Macedonia	1–0	3–0	Friendly
2	14 October 2003	Ferenc Puskás Stadium, Budapest, Hungary	Hungary	1–0	2–1	UEFA Euro 2004 qualifying
3	14 October 2003	Ferenc Puskás Stadium, Budapest, Hungary	Hungary	2–1	2–1	UEFA Euro 2004 qualifying
4	16 November 2003	Wisła Płock Stadium, Płock, Poland	Serbia and Montenegro	1–0	4–3	Friendly
5	18 February 2004	Estadio Bahía Sur, San Fernando, Spain	Slovenia	2–0	2–0	Friendly

== Honours ==
Wisła Kraków

- Ekstraklasa: 2007–08, 2008–09

Individual

- Polish Newcomer of the Year: 2002
- Ekstraklasa Player of the Month: August 2010, September 2010
