= Mariusz Liberda =

Polish footballer (born 1976)

Personal information
- Full name: Mariusz Liberda
- Date of birth: 24 December 1976 (age 49)
- Place of birth: Żary, Poland
- Height: 1.96 m (6 ft 5 in)
- Position: Goalkeeper

Team information
- Current team: Wisła Płock (goalkeeping coach)

Senior career*
Years	Team	Apps	(Gls)
1995–1996	Promień Żary		
1996–2001	Polonia Warsaw	37	(0)
2001–2005	Dyskobolia Groclin	77	(0)
2005–2007	Zagłębie Lubin	39	(0)
2007	Livingston	14	(0)
2008	Polonia Warsaw	5	(0)
2008	Polonia Warsaw II		

International career
2002–2003	Poland	3	(0)
- * Club domestic league appearances and goals

Mariusz Liberda (born 24 December 1976) is a Polish former professional footballer who played as a goalkeeper. He is currently the goalkeeping coach of Wisła Płock. Liberda made three appearances for the Poland national team.

Since retiring from playing, Liberda has been a goalkeeping coach at several clubs in Poland. In 2021, he was appointed as goalkeeping coach at Świt Nowy Dwór Mazowiecki.

== Honours ==
Polonia Warsaw

- Ekstraklasa: 1999–2000
- Polish Cup: 2000–01
- Polish League Cup: 1999–2000

Zagłębie Lubin

- Ekstraklasa: 2006–07
