= Andreas Elias Büchner =

German physician

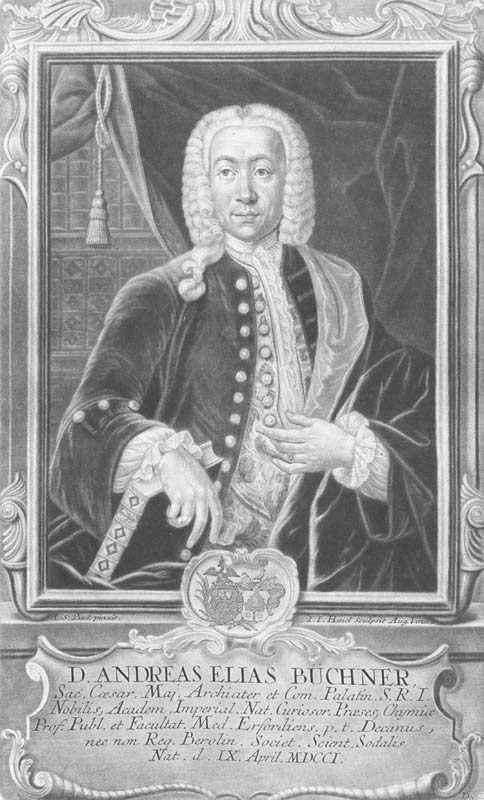

Andreas Elias Büchner (9 April 1701 – 29 July 1769) was a German physician. He served as an influential professor at the University of Erfurt (then in the Electorate of Mainz) and edited seven volumes a systematic reference on medicine begun by his teacher Friedrich Hoffmann - Medicina rationalis systematica. This included stringent approaches to diagnosis, treatment along with indications and contraindications for various drugs. He also proposed methods to assist the deaf in hearing.

== Life and work ==
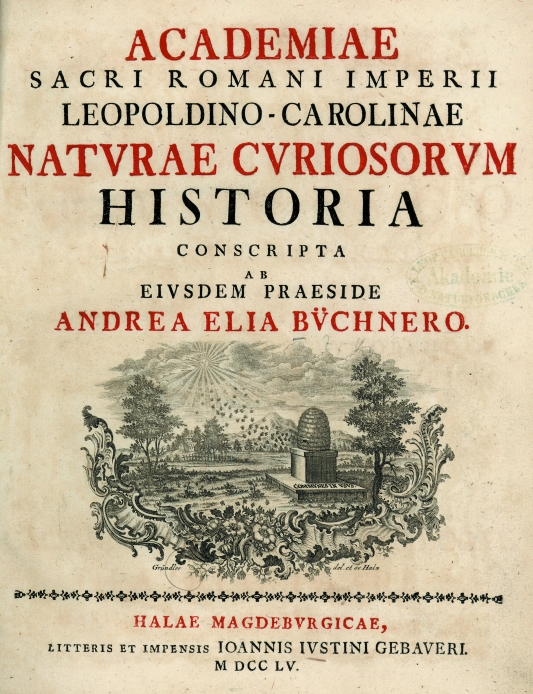

Büchner was born in Erfurt in a family of theologians. His father Wolfgang Heinrich was a teacher at the Ratsgymnasium and a priest at the hospital. He went to the Augustinian School before going to study medicine at Erfurt, Halle (1719) and Leipzig, receiving a doctorate in Erfurt in 1721. At Erfurt he was influenced greatly by Friedrich Hoffmann. He travelled across Europe and then became a physician at Rudolstadt in 1726 and three years later became a professor extraordinary at Erfurt, becoming a full professor in 1737. He rejected an offer to become a personal physician to the Russian Empress Anna. He moved to Halle in 1744, replacing Johann Heinrich Schulze on his death. He was involved in setting up a natural history collection that would help provide an income to an orphanage. He became a privy medical councilor for the Prussian King. He served as president of the Leopoldina academy into which he was accepted in 1726 and published a history of it in 1755. He supervised nearly 30 dissertations and led 323 oral defenses of doctoral candidates including that of Dorothea Erzleben in 1754 (to whom he wrote a poem in Latin). His most important work was through editing seven volumes of the Medicina rationalis systematica (begun by his teacher Hoffmann) in which he documented symptoms, diagnosis, treatments, and the use of drugs. He emphasised the care involved in differentiating symptoms and the variations in drug effect with age and sex with special care to be taken in the cases of children and women. He also took an interest in public health, the safety of foods and the dangers of carbon monoxide from coal.

He married the daughter of Coburg teacher in 1729 and after her death in 1759 he married a doctor's widow in 1764. He fell ill with pneumonia and had several relapses leading to his death. The flowering plant genus Buchnera is named for him.
