= Unia Kunice =

Polish football club

- Full name: Klub Piłkarski Unia Kunice
- Founded: 1946; 79 years ago
- Ground: OSIRIW Stadium
- Capacity: 900
- Chairman: Piotr Ciechanowicz
- Manager: Jarosław Gad
- League: Regional league Zielona Góra
- 2023–24: Regional league Zielona Góra, 9th of 16

Unia Kunice is a Polish association football club based in Żary. As of the 2024–25 season, they compete in the Zielona Góra group of the regional league.

The club played in the III liga in the 2007–08 and 2008–09 seasons, but was thereafter relegated to the regional league.
