= 893 Leopoldina =

Main-belt asteroid

Discovery
- Discovered by: M. F. Wolf
- Discovery site: Heidelberg Obs.
- Discovery date: 31 May 1918

Designations
- Named after: Academy of Sciences Leopoldina (Germany's nat'l academy)
- Alternative designations: A918 KD · 1935 OL; 1918 DS
- Minor planet category: main-belt · (outer) background

Orbital characteristics
- Epoch 31 May 2020 (JD 2459000.5)
- Uncertainty parameter 0
- Observation arc: 101.67 yr (37,134 d)
- Aphelion: 3.5069 AU
- Perihelion: 2.6027 AU
- Semi-major axis: 3.0548 AU
- Eccentricity: 0.1480
- Orbital period (sidereal): 5.34 yr (1,950 d)
- Mean anomaly: 291.98°
- Mean motion: 0° 11^{m} 4.56^{s} / day
- Inclination: 17.025°
- Longitude of ascending node: 144.94°
- Argument of perihelion: 222.40°

Physical characteristics
- Dimensions: 82.8 km × 59.8 km
- Mean diameter: 75.55±0.97 km; 76.14±4.5 km; 85.992±0.577 km
- Synodic rotation period: 14.115±0.003 h (Note: Lightcurve plot of (893) Leopoldina, Palmer Divide Observatory, B. D. Warner (2008). Rotation period 14.115±0.003 hours with a brightness amplitude of 0.18±0.02 mag. Quality code is 3. Summary figures at the LCDB.)
- Geometric albedo: 0.039±0.007; 0.0497±0.006; 0.051±0.001
- Spectral type: Tholen = XF; C (S3OS2); B–V = 0.670±0.031; U–B = 0.226±0.044
- Absolute magnitude (H): 9.6

893 Leopoldina (prov. designation: A918 KD or 1918 DS) is a large and elongated background asteroid from the outer regions of the asteroid belt. It was discovered by German astronomer Max Wolf at the Heidelberg Observatory on 31 May 1918. The dark carbonaceous C-type asteroid has a rotation period of 14.1 hours and measures approximately 76 kilometers (47 miles) in diameter. It was named for Germany's national academy, the Academy of Sciences Leopoldina in Halle.

== Orbit and classification ==
Leopoldina is a non-family asteroid of the main belt's background population when applying the hierarchical clustering method to its proper orbital elements. It orbits the Sun in the outer asteroid belt at a distance of 2.6–3.5 AU once every 5 years and 4 months (1,950 days; semi-major axis of 3.05 AU). Its orbit has an eccentricity of 0.15 and an inclination of 17° with respect to the ecliptic. The body's observation arc begins with its official discovery observation at Heidelberg Observatory on 31 May 1918.

== Physical characteristics ==
In the Tholen classification, Leopoldina's asteroid spectral type is closest to that of an X-type, and somewhat similar to that of a dark F-type asteroid (XF), while in both the Tholen- and SMASS-like taxonomy of the Small Solar System Objects Spectroscopic Survey (S3OS2), it is a common carbonaceous C-type asteroid.

== Naming ==
This minor planet was named for Germany's national academy, the Academy of Sciences Leopoldina (German: Carolinisch-Leopoldinische Akademie der Naturforscher) in Halle, Saxony-Anhalt. The naming citation was mentioned in The Names of the Minor Planets by Paul Herget in 1955 (H 86).

=== Rotation period ===
In April 2008, a rotational lightcurve of Leopoldina was obtained from photometric observations by Brian Warner at the Palmer Divide Observatory (716) in Colorado. Analysis gave a classically shaped bimodal lightcurve with a well-defined rotation period of 14.115±0.003 hours and a brightness variation of 0.18±0.02 magnitude (U=3). The result supersedes Warner's previous observation from August 2005, which determined a period of 10.51±0.01 hours and an amplitude of 0.35±0.02 magnitude (U=2).

=== Diameter and albedo ===
According to the survey carried out by the Japanese Akari satellite, the Infrared Astronomical Satellite IRAS, and the NEOWISE mission of NASA's Wide-field Infrared Survey Explorer (WISE), Leopoldina measures (75.55±0.97), (76.14±4.5) and (85.992±0.577) kilometers in diameter and its surface has an albedo of (0.051±0.001), (0.0497±0.006) and (0.039±0.007), respectively. The Collaborative Asteroid Lightcurve Link adopts the results obtained by IRAS, that is, an albedo of 0.0497 and a diameter of 76.14 kilometers based on an absolute magnitude of 9.47.

Alternative mean-diameter measurements published by the WISE team include (57.900±15.097 km), (68.91±23.37 km), (76±8 km), (76.1±15.2 km) and (76.623±2.309 km) with albedos in the range of 0.049 to 0.06.

Three asteroid occultation were obtained on 29 January 1996, 30 August 2010 and 16 May 2015. They gave a best-fit ellipse dimension of 79.0 × 72.0 kilometers, 82.8 × 59.8 kilometers (best), and 75.0 × 75.0 kilometers, respectively. These timed observations are taken when the asteroid passes in front of a distant star.
