= Church of the Sacred Heart of Jesus, Żary =

Gothic parish church in Żary, Poland

Church of the Sacred Heart of Jesus
- Fara, Żary Parish Church
- Kościół Najświętszego Serca Pana Jezusa w Żarach
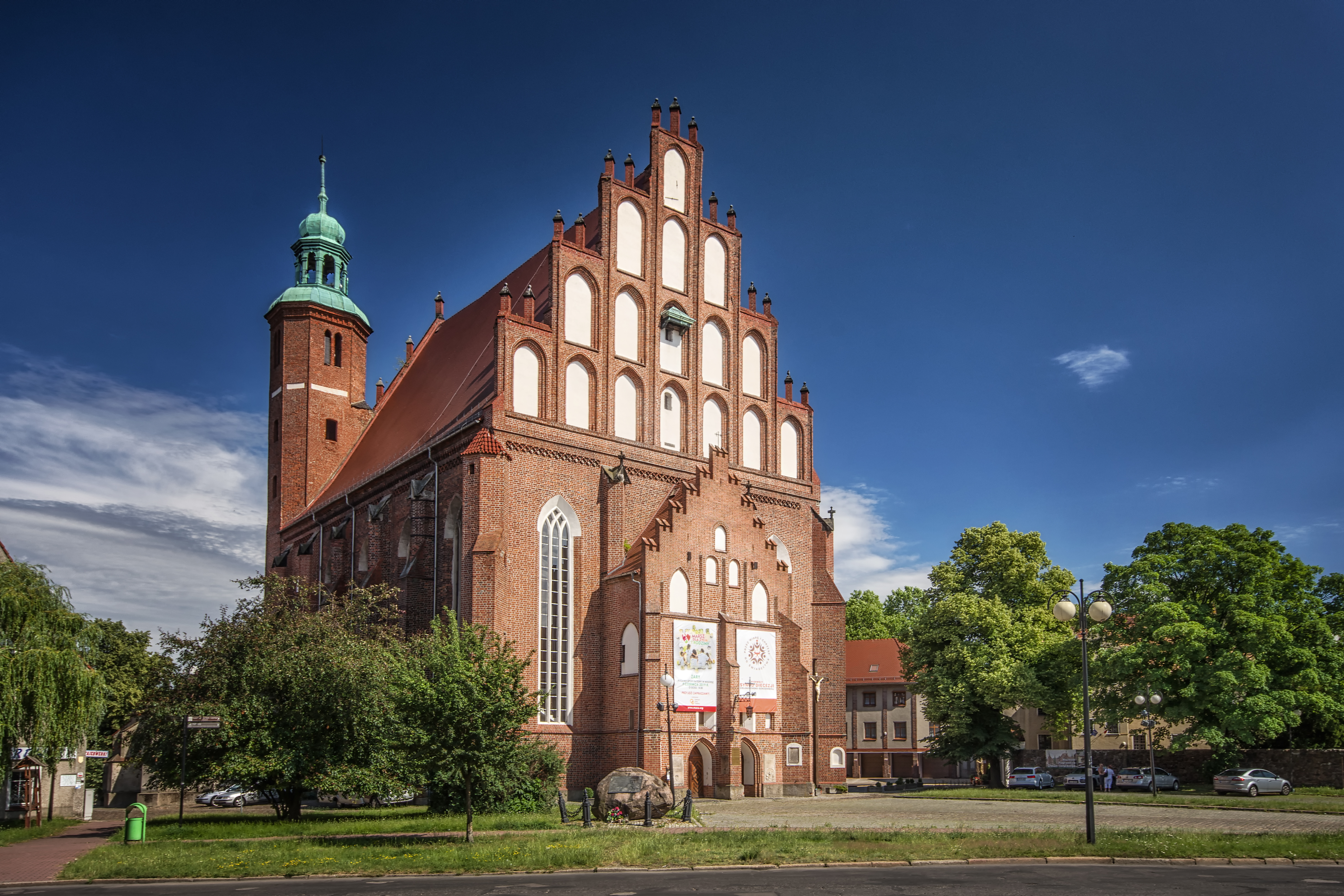
- The church in 2019

- Location within Lubusz Voivodeship Location within Poland
- 51°38′18″N 15°8′47″E
- Location: Żary
- Address: pl. kard. Stefana Wyszyńskiego 4, 68-200 Żary
- Country: Poland
- Denomination: Roman Catholic
- Previous denomination: Lutheran (1528–1945); Polish-Catholic (chancel, 1963–1975)
- Website: zarynspj.pl

History
- Status: Parish church
- Dedication: Sacred Heart of Jesus
- Earlier dedication: Virgin Mary
- Consecrated: July 1308 (chancel); 15 June 1980 (reconsecration)

Architecture
- Functional status: Active
- Heritage designation: Registered monument, no. 123
- Designated: 23 July 1958
- Style: Brick Gothic, Baroque (Promnitz Chapel)
- Years built: 13th–15th century; rebuilt 1975–1984
- Groundbreaking: c. 1230
- Completed: 1430 (vault of the nave)

Specifications
- Materials: Brick

Administration
- Diocese: Diocese of Zielona Góra–Gorzów
- Deanery: Żary
- Parish: Sacred Heart of Jesus in Żary

The Church of the Sacred Heart of Jesus (Polish: Kościół Najświętszego Serca Pana Jezusa), commonly called the Fara (parish church) and also referred to locally as the "Żary Cathedral" (Katedra Żarska), is a Gothic Roman Catholic parish church in Żary, Lubusz Voivodeship, Poland. Built of brick from the 13th to the 15th century as the town's main church, it was dedicated to the Virgin Mary before the Second World War. It is a three-aisled hall church with a Gothic chancel consecrated in 1308 and a Baroque burial chapel of the noble Promnitz family added in 1670–1672. Severely damaged in an air raid in 1944, it was rebuilt in 1975–1984 and has been the church of the Roman Catholic parish of the Sacred Heart of Jesus in the Diocese of Zielona Góra–Gorzów since 1980. The church is listed in the Polish register of monuments.

== History ==
=== Romanesque church ===
A church in Żary is first mentioned in 1207; the record most likely refers to a building on the site of the present church, of which no visible remains survive. Around 1230–1240 a large brick church with two aisles and wooden ceilings was built on the site; parts of it survive on the north side of the chancel, including relics of two Romanesque windows. Around 1280 a square stone tower was added in the corner between the nave and the chancel.

=== Gothic rebuilding ===
At the end of the 13th century the church was enlarged, probably on the initiative of the parish priest Baldwinus. The Romanesque chancel was replaced by a larger Gothic chancel of four bays with a three-sided apse and a rib vault, which was consecrated in July 1308. A sacristy and a Lady chapel were built on the north side at the same time, and the tower was raised with an octagonal brick upper storey.

In the last decade of the 14th century the nave was rebuilt in its present form. The date 1401 above the stone west portal is regarded as the date of completion of the nave walls, and the vault was completed in 1430, giving the hall interior its present appearance. In 1445 the Chapel of St Barbara (today the sacristy) was added to the chancel; the west porch was built at the end of the 15th century and a polygonal baptismal chapel in 1511. In 1496 a local craftsman, Martin Hänsel, built a large organ, and in 1501, when the interior was renovated, the church had twenty altars.

=== Reformation and early modern period ===
In 1528 the last Catholic parish priest left Żary, and the church was taken over by Lutheran clergy; it remained Protestant until 1945. In 1559 the east gable of the nave collapsed during a storm, destroying the roof and the vault of the chancel; the vault was rebuilt by 1581. In 1586 an astronomical clock made by the physicist Michael Hirschweld, commissioned by Seifried von Promnitz, was installed in the church.

Members of the Promnitz family, lords of Żary, were buried in a crypt beneath the baptismal chapel. When it was full, Erdmann I and Ulrich von Promnitz founded a new burial chapel with a crypt, built against the east wall of the chancel in 1670–1672. Its interior was decorated with stucco, sculpted angels and paintings in tondi by Johann Joachim Vogel of Chemnitz, showing Old Testament scenes and, on the vault, scenes from the life of Christ; the work on the decoration continued until 1698. The arch between the chapel and the chancel is framed by a richly carved portal with spiral columns, the Promnitz coat of arms and an inscription dated 1670.

In 1684 a fire destroyed the astronomical clock and much of the furnishings. The rebuilding was carried out by the master builders Kaspar Müller of Bolesławiec and Stefan Spinetto of Żagań; the brick interior was plastered and fitted with two-storey galleries. The chancel was rebuilt by 1694, with a new altar by the sculptor Caspar Guden of Żagań and the painter Christoph Reichelt of Zittau. In 1775 Johann Gottfried Hildebrandt built a large new organ in a Baroque case. Building and conservation work was carried out in 1870–1896 and the interior of the nave was renovated in 1912–1913.

=== Destruction and post-war period ===
During an American air raid on Żary on 11 April 1944 a bomb pierced the eastern bays of the vault of the south aisle, and the blast destroyed the roof covering; the church could no longer be used. After the war the building stood roofless and empty. In 1948 it was handed over to the small Evangelical congregation, which was unable to maintain it. In the same year the Hildebrandt organ (without its case) was taken to Płock Cathedral, while the altar and pulpit were removed to unknown locations. After the church was entered in the register of monuments in 1958, the roof structure was repaired and the roof covered.

In 1963 the authorities gave the church to the Polish-Catholic community, which used only the chancel; the chancel arch was walled up, dividing the building in two. From 1971 the nave belonged to the Roman Catholic parish. The parish priest Tadeusz Demel obtained the whole church in exchange for restoring, at the parish's expense, the former hospital Church of the Holy Spirit in Żagańska Street for the Polish-Catholic community; the exchange took place in August 1975.

=== Reconstruction ===
The most difficult task of the reconstruction, which began in 1975, was stabilising the cracked east wall with the chancel arch, following a design by the engineer Józef Hermanowicz. On 15 June 1980 Bishop Wilhelm Pluta reconsecrated the church, which received the dedication to the Sacred Heart of Jesus and became the church of a newly established parish. Under the first parish priest, Tadeusz Kleszcz, new furnishings were made, including the altar, tabernacle, confessionals and pews; the Stations of the Cross were painted by the local artist Stanisław Antosz. In 1981–1983 a concert organ was built by the firm of Stanisław Bożko of Wrocław to a design by Feliks Rączkowski; it was fitted into a 19th-century organ case brought from the church in Świerzawa. The reconstruction was completed in 1984. In 2001–2005 the roof was renovated and a chapel of perpetual adoration was built.

=== 21st century ===
An architectural survey of the nave was carried out in 2016, and in 2021–2022 researchers investigated the church's underground spaces, documenting with 3D laser scans the channels of two former heating systems. In August 2023 the anthropologist Joanna Wysocka examined the remains in the two crypts, from the 16th and 17th centuries, identifying 32 individuals, most probably members of the Promnitz family. The remains were reburied in new coffins in January 2024.

Since 2023 the church has been open to visitors, with access to a lapidarium, the crypts and the bell tower, including occasional night tours; proceeds from tickets support the restoration of the Promnitz Chapel. The conservation of the Baroque portal and the interior of the chapel began in 2024 and is carried out by the conservators Gaja and Ihor Zamoyski of Kraków. The first stage (2024), covering almost 100 m^{2} (1,100 sq ft) of the portal, cost 200,000 złoty and was funded by the KGHM Polska Miedź Foundation, Lubusz Voivodeship and the parish. The second stage (2025), on the portal and the west wall of the chapel, was funded by the Ministry of Culture and National Heritage, the town of Żary, the voivodeship and the parish; the third stage (2026) was funded by the town, the Lubusz Voivodeship Monuments Conservator and the parish. In 2026 the church was laser-scanned and a 3D model of the building was produced.

== Architecture ==
The church is a brick, three-aisled hall church. The five-bay nave is divided by slender octagonal piers carrying the vaults and pointed arcades. Because of the marked difference in scale between the nave and the chancel, the two are joined by an unusually low chancel arch. The side elevations are articulated by buttresses and tall windows, with portals on the north and south sides and ceramic friezes below the eaves. The west gable is stepped, decorated with pinnacles and densely set blind arcades, and the main entrance has a richly moulded stone portal. The tower, square in its lower part and octagonal above, stands on the north side of the chancel.

Surviving historic features include the paintings, sculptures and stucco of the Promnitz Chapel together with its portal, the Gothic main portal, a carved stone tomb slab of a cleric from the second half of the 14th century in the west porch, and more than a dozen 16th- and 17th-century epitaphs set into the outer walls.
