= Friedrich von Wendt =

German physician (1738–1818)

- Born: 28 September 1738; Sorau, Holy Roman Empire
- Died: 24 September 1818 (aged 79); Erlangen, Kingdom of Prussia
- Education: Martin Luther University of Halle-Wittenberg; University of Halle
- Scientific career
- Fields: Physics
- Workplaces: University of Erlangen-Nuremberg

Friedrich von Wendt (28 September 1738 – 24 September 1818) was a German physician.

Born in Sorau, von Wendt studied medicine at the Universities of Halle and Göttingen, earning his doctorate at the latter institution in 1762. Following graduation he successively worked as a physician in the town of Genthin, served as a Stadtphysicus in Pless (Upper Silesia) and was a personal physician to the Prince of Anhalt. In 1778 he was appointed professor of medicine at the University of Erlangen, where he founded a clinical institute later the same year.

In 1808–09 he published the journal Annalen des Klinischen Instituts auf der Akademie zu Erlangen. From 1811 to 1818 he was president of the Deutsche Akademie der Naturforscher Leopoldina.

Von Wendt died in Erlangen in 1818.

== Selected published works ==
- "Historia tracheotomiae nuperrime administratae", 1774.
- "De febribus remittentibus semestris hiberni ann. MDCCXCV-XCVI commentatio", 1796.
- "Formvlae Medicamentorvm in Institvto Clinico Erlangensi Vsitatorum", 1807.
