= Żary =

Town in Lubusz Voivodeship, Poland

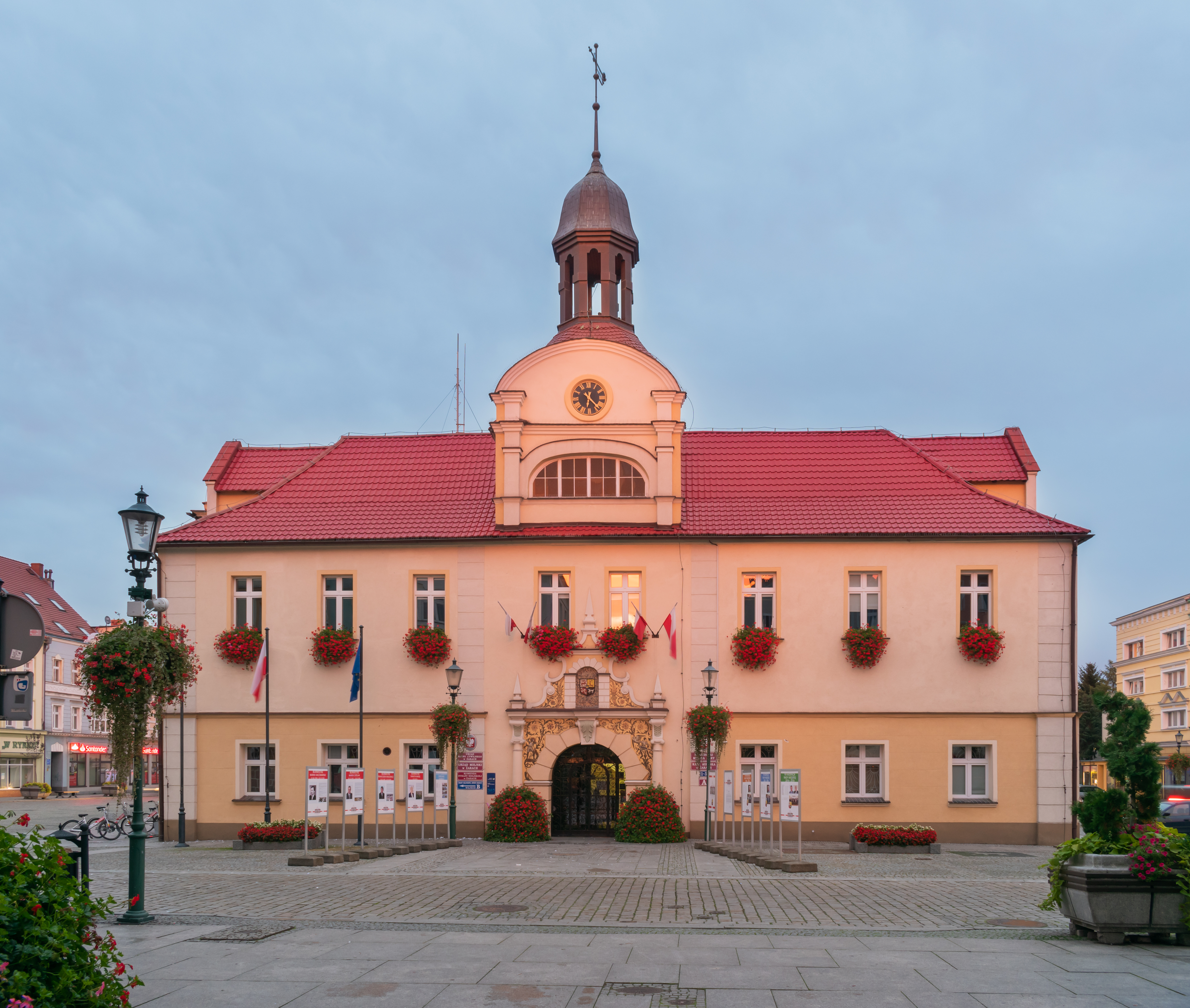
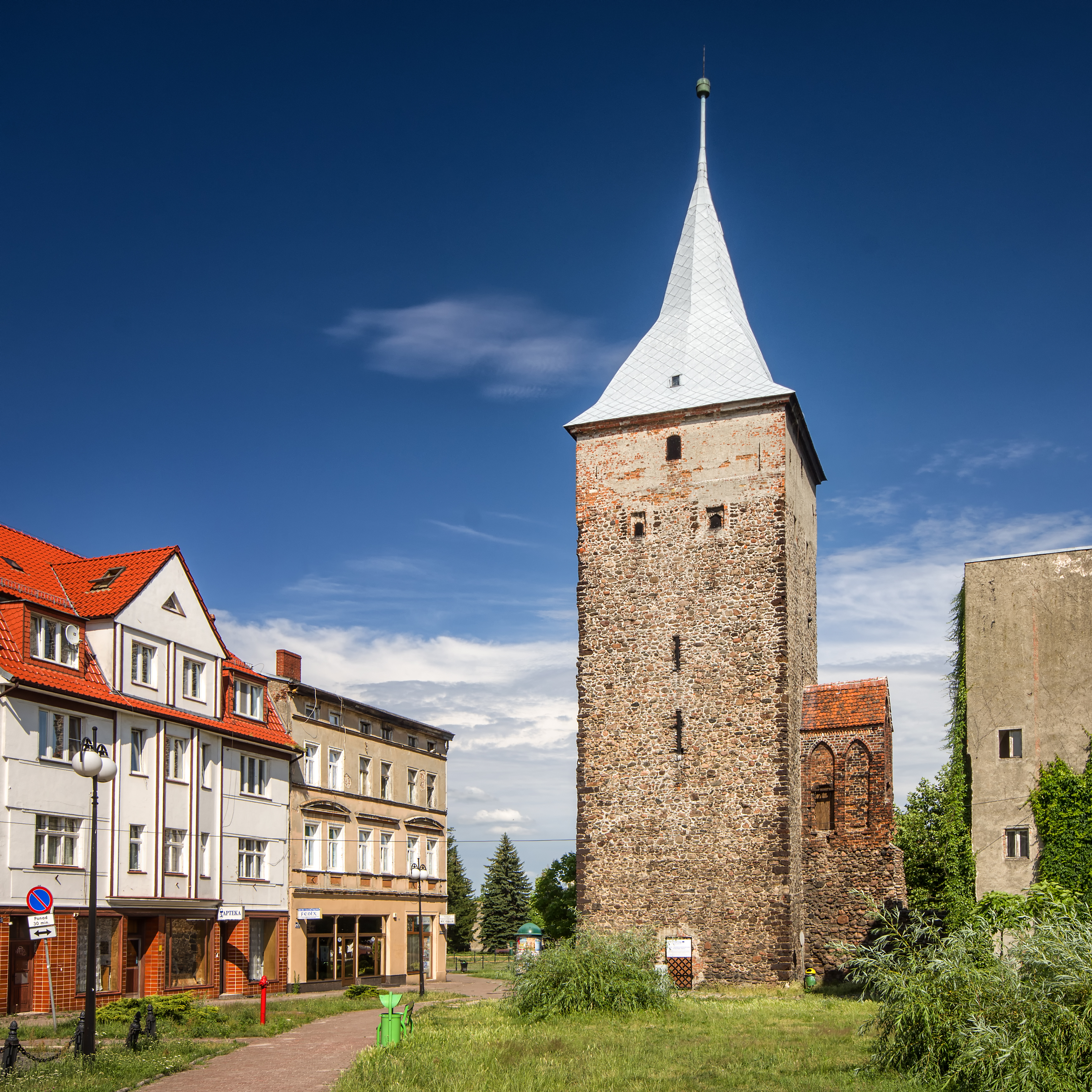
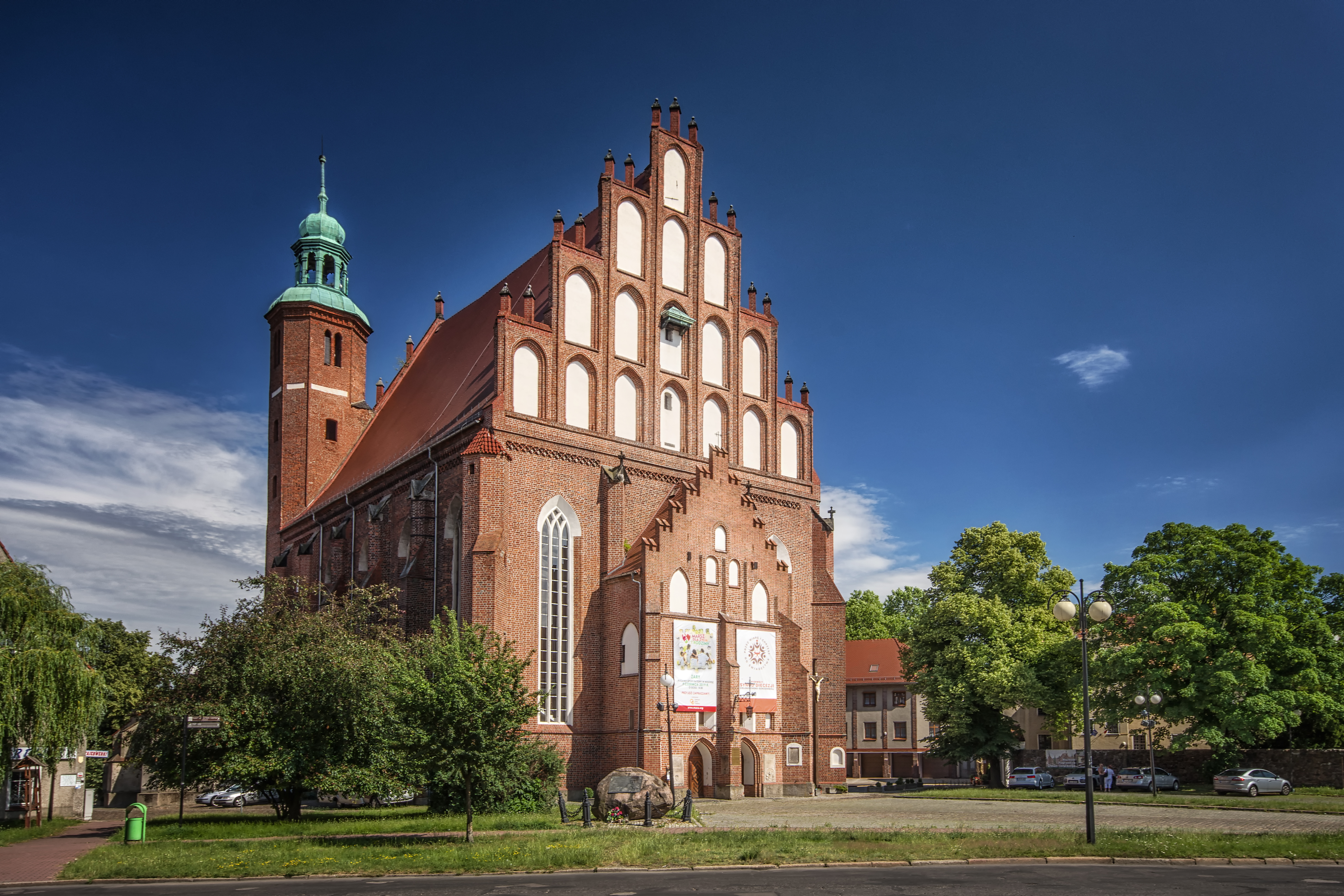
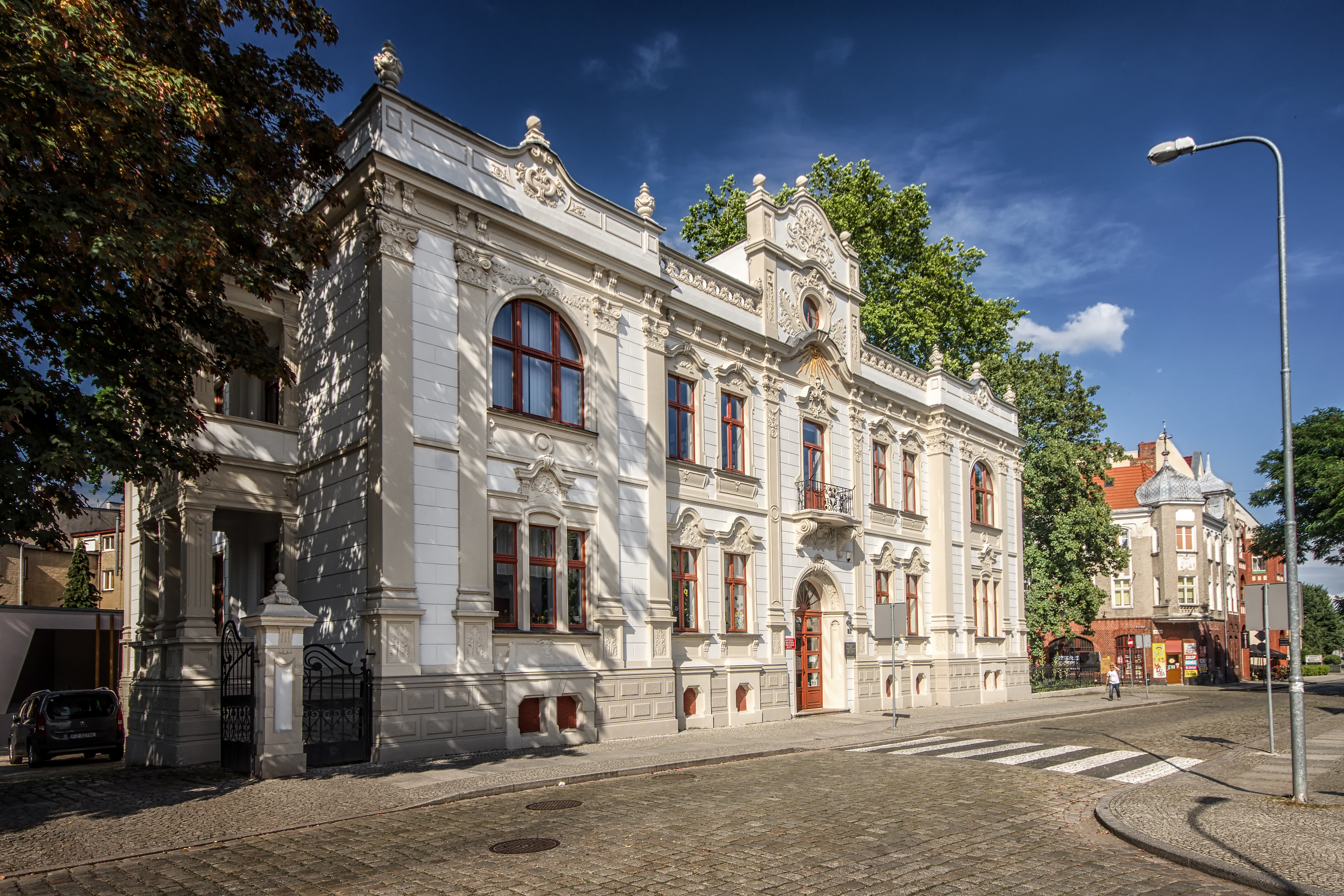
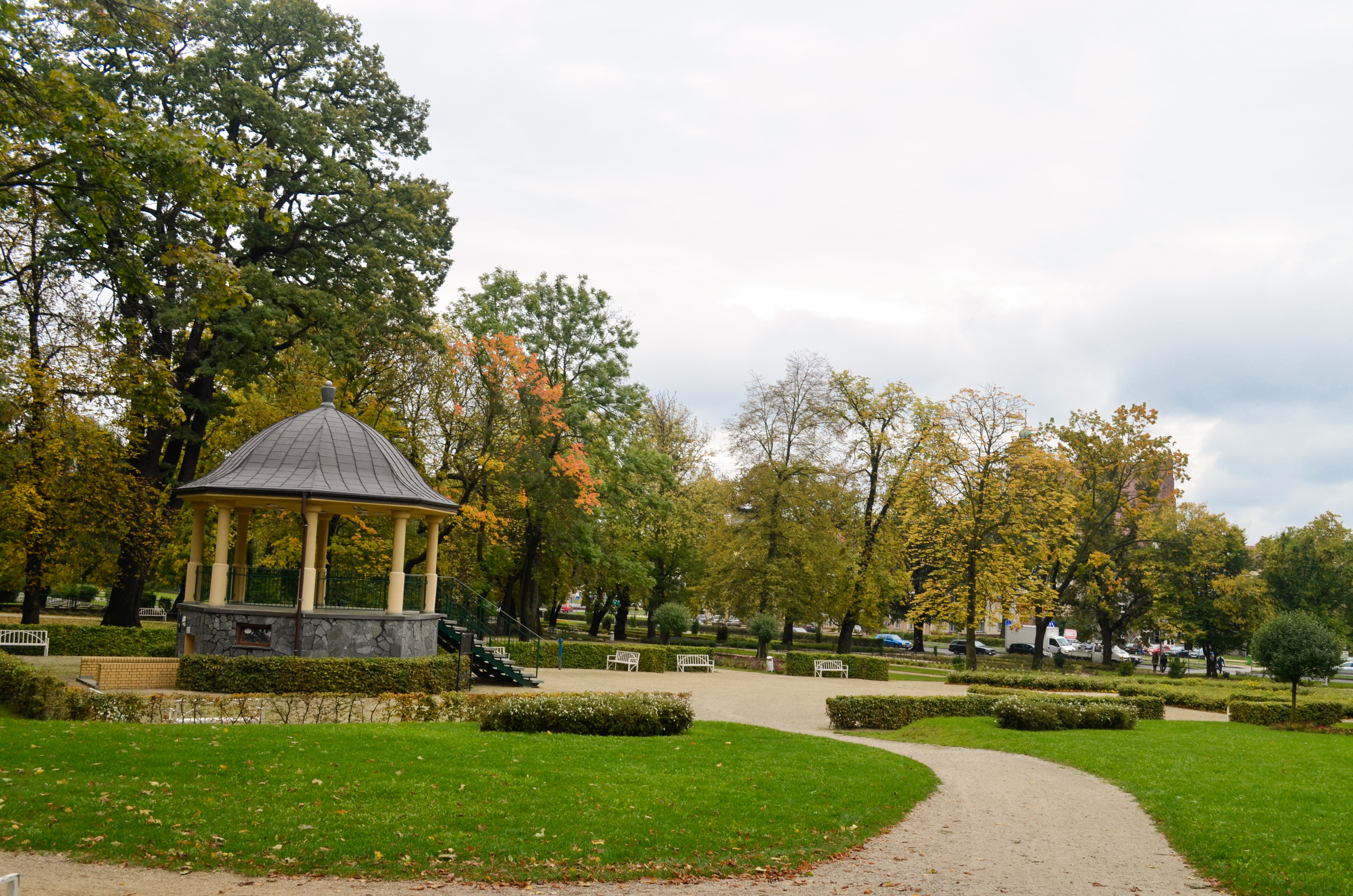
- Town Hall at Market Square Lower Gate Holy Heart of Jesus Church Municipal Library Promnitz Park

- Flag Coat of arms

- Location within Poland
- Coordinates: 51°38′N 15°8′E
- Country: Poland
- Voivodeship: Lubusz
- County: Żary
- Gmina: Żary (urban gmina)
- First mentioned: 1007
- Town rights: 1260

Government
  - Mayor: Edyta Gajda

Area
  - Total: 33.24 km^{2} (12.83 sq mi)
- Elevation: 160 m (520 ft)

Population (2019-06-30)
  - Total: 37,502
  - Density: 1,128/km^{2} (2,922/sq mi)
- Time zone: UTC+1 (CET)
  - Summer (DST): UTC+2 (CEST)
- Postal code: 68-200 to 68-205
- Car plates: FZA
- Climate: Cfb
- Website: zary.pl

Żary ([ˈʐarɨ]; Lower Sorbian: Žarow, pronounced [ˈʒarɔw]; German: Sorau, pronounced [ˈzoːʁaʊ]) is a town in western Poland with 37,502 inhabitants (2019), situated in the Lubusz Voivodeship. It is the administrative seat of the Żary County and of the Gmina Żary within the county, though the town is not part of the gmina (commune).

Żary is located in the east of the historic Lower Lusatia region, in the borderland with the Silesian lowlands and Greater Poland, roughly outlined by the Bóbr and Oder rivers. The city is one of the biggest economic and tourist centers in the southern Lubuskie region and the largest town in the Polish part of Lusatia, and is also referred as its unofficial capital. The city, whose history dates back more than 1000 years, features many historic sites.

== History ==
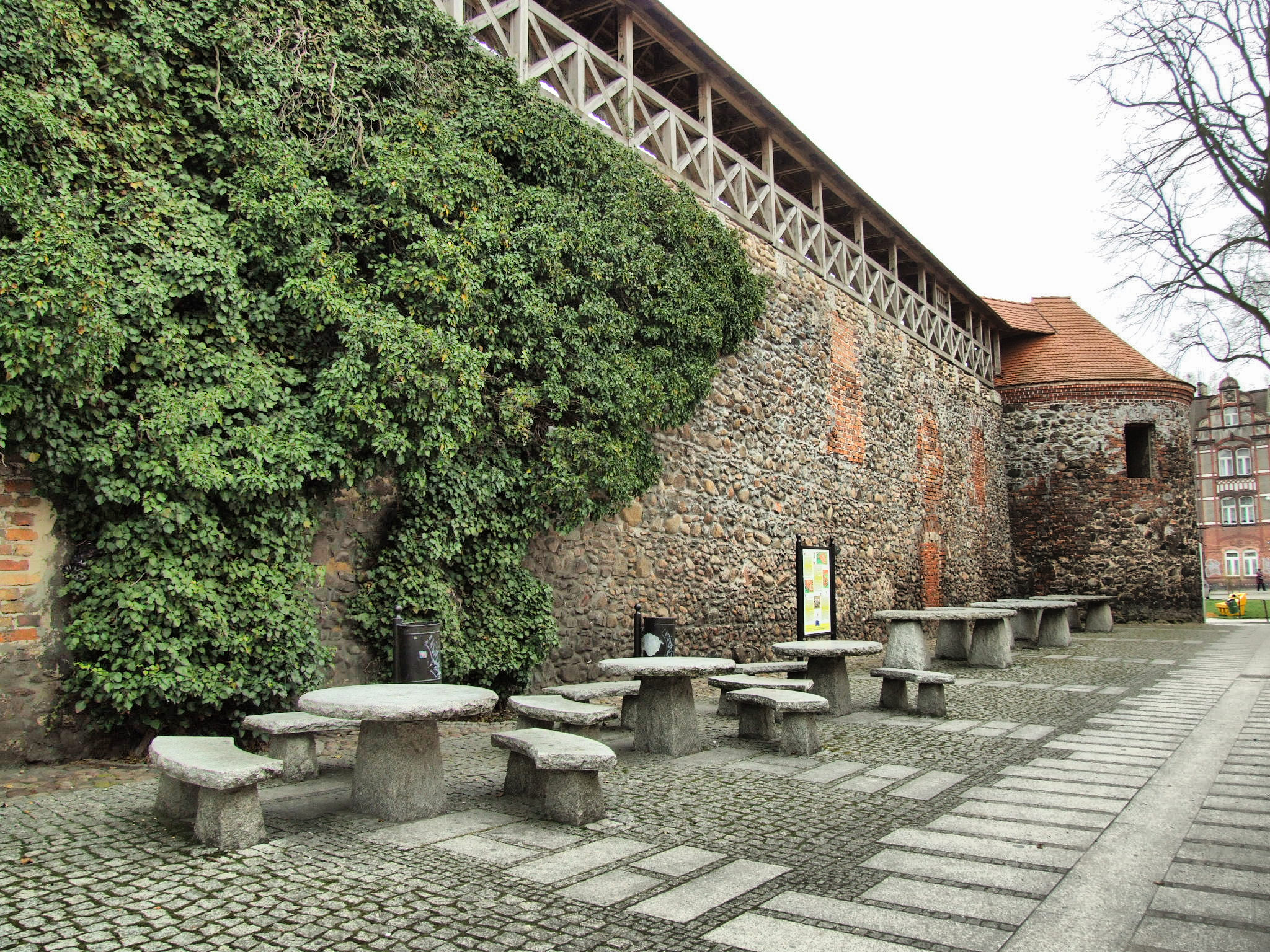
Medieval defensive walls

The beginnings of settlement in the Żary area date back to prehistoric times. The name "Zara", deriving most likely from a small, independent West Slavic tribe, appeared for the first time in 1007 in the chronicles of Thietmar of Merseburg, after Duke Bolesław I Chrobry of Poland had conquered the Żary land along with Lusatia. Regained by Emperor Conrad II in 1031. In the early 13th century it was part of the Duchy of Silesia within fragmented Piast-ruled Poland. Lost by Poland, the town was chartered on the Magdeburg law by the Wettin margrave Henry III of Meissen about 1260. It covered the following three areas: a trade settlement on the “Salt Trail” running from Leipzig to Wrocław, a fortified town erected among bogs (in the area of the later castle), and a Franciscan settlement established in 1274.

The city was under the domain of the Polish Silesian Piasts until Holy Roman Emperor Charles IV in 1364 purchased Lower Lusatia and incorporated it into the Lands of the Bohemian Crown. In 1635 the town became part of the Electorate of Saxony per the Peace of Prague. The Saxon Electors also served as Kings of Poland in 1697–1706 and 1709–1763 and of the two main routes connecting Warsaw and Dresden ran through the town at that time. Kings Augustus II the Strong and Augustus III of Poland visited the town many times, including in 1705, 1718, 1730, 1748 and 1763. The royal cabinet minister Erdmann II of Promnitz built a new Baroque palace in the town.

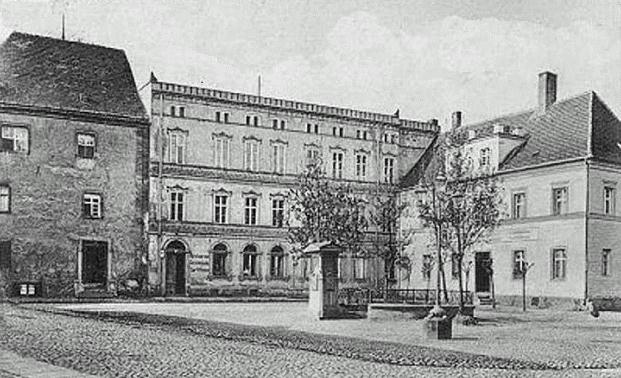
The Castle Square in the early 20th century

After the 1815 Congress of Vienna, Sorau fell to the Kingdom of Prussia, which in 1871 was united with other German states into the German Empire. The town's prominent families included the Dewins, Packs, Bibersteins and Promnitzs, whose residence was the castle-palace complex.

Near the end of World War II, Soviet Red Army troops conquered the town on 13 February 1945. After the war, British and American representatives at the Potsdam Conference of July–August 1945 were initially unwilling to agree to Polish administration being extended as far west as Stalin demanded. After some negotiations, both the Soviet and Polish representatives indicated that they would be willing to concede a frontier along the historic Lusatian border with Silesia at the Oder-Bóbr-Kwisa rivers, which would have left Sorau in German territory. However, ultimately the town was transferred to Poland under extensive border changes promulgated at the conference. The German residents were expelled, and the town was gradually repopulated by Poles, incl. those displaced from former Eastern Poland annexed by the Soviet Union. In the following years, the Polish anti-communist resistance was active in Żary, including the nationwide Home Army-NIE-Freedom and Independence Association, the Iskra Underground Scout Organization, and the local Grupa Leśna nr 5 (Forest Group No. 5).

Initially, from 1945 it was administratively located in the Lower Silesian/Wrocław Voivodeship, then from 1950 to 1975 in the "larger" Zielona Góra Voivodeship, and from 1975 to 1998, in the "smaller" Zielona Góra Voivodeship.

== Economy ==
During World War II a branch of the Focke-Wulf aircraft factory was moved to the town. In April 1944, after a bombing raid of the Allies, some buildings of the Old Town were reduced to a heap of rubble.

Today Żary, which is a county seat, features headquarters of many offices and institutions, used by residents of this part of the region, including the Tax Office, Social Insurance Institution, Employment Office, 8 bank branches, insurance companies, high schools, and the Lusatian Higher School of the Humanities.

Żary's border area location has a significant influence on its economic growth. In the proximity of the city (20–40 km) there are Polish-German border crossings in Olszyna, Łęknica, Przewóz, and Zasieki as well as a railroad checkpoint in Forst. Żary is also an attractive tourist destination.

== Transport ==
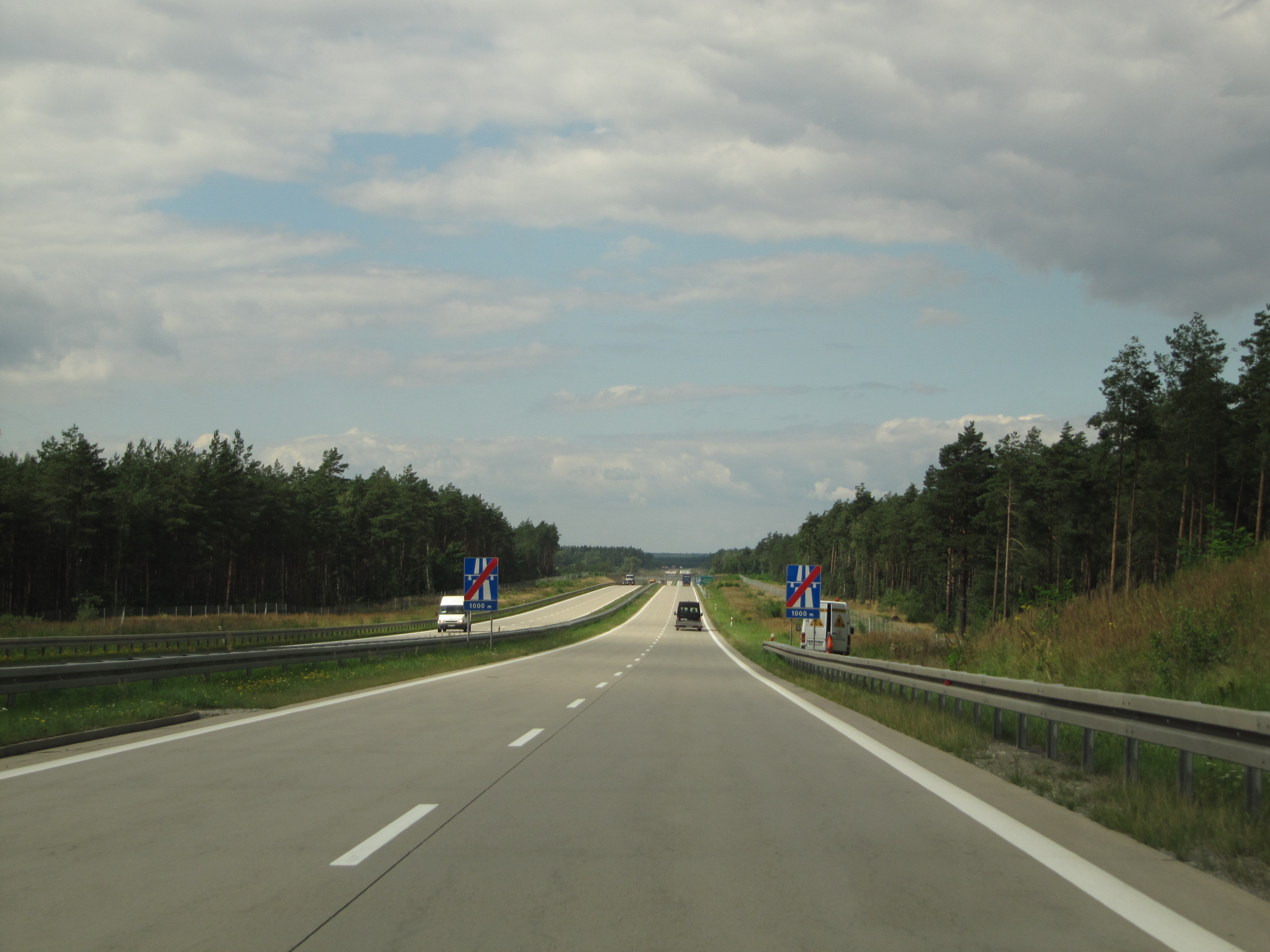
The A18 autostrada (freeway), which runs near Żary

Two main national roads, no. 12 and 27 intersect in Żary. They run together on a stretch of the city bypass. Two of the three sections of the city bypass that have been opened have significantly improved the traffic in the city. Construction of the bypass was subsidized by the Phare Fund. Presently, work continues on the last section of the bypass, which will be completed in 2005.

In the proximity of the city runs the international European route E36 from Berlin to Bolesławiec, which soon will be transformed into the A18 autostrada. On this road, near the border with Germany, 25 kilometres (16 miles) from Żary, in nearby Olszyna there is one of the biggest cargo terminals in the country. Construction of the A18 and A4 highways is underway and should be completed by the end of 2010. The E36 on the German side is known as the Bundesautobahn 15 highway, providing a quick access to Berlin via a network of motorways. The international airports in Berlin are about 160–185 kilometres (99–115 miles) away, about a one-and-a-half-hour drive away.

Inter-City trains travel from Berlin and Hamburg via Żary to Kraków. In a relatively short distance from Żary there are smaller airports in Babimost near Zielona Góra as well as in the German town of Rothenburg (about 15 kilometres (9 miles) from the border crossing at Przewóz).

In Żary there are two telecommunication companies, having a great effect on the quality of provided service. The city has also good coverage of wireless service providers. It also has a fiber optic network that offers quick Internet access.

=== Roads running through Żary ===
Voivodeship road 287

National road 27

National road 12

=== Important roads running near Żary ===
Voivodeship road 350

National road 32

National road 112

National road 115

National road 156

Motorway 15 / E 36

Motorway A18 / E 36

Motorway A4 / E 40

Expressway S3 / E 65

== Historical sites ==
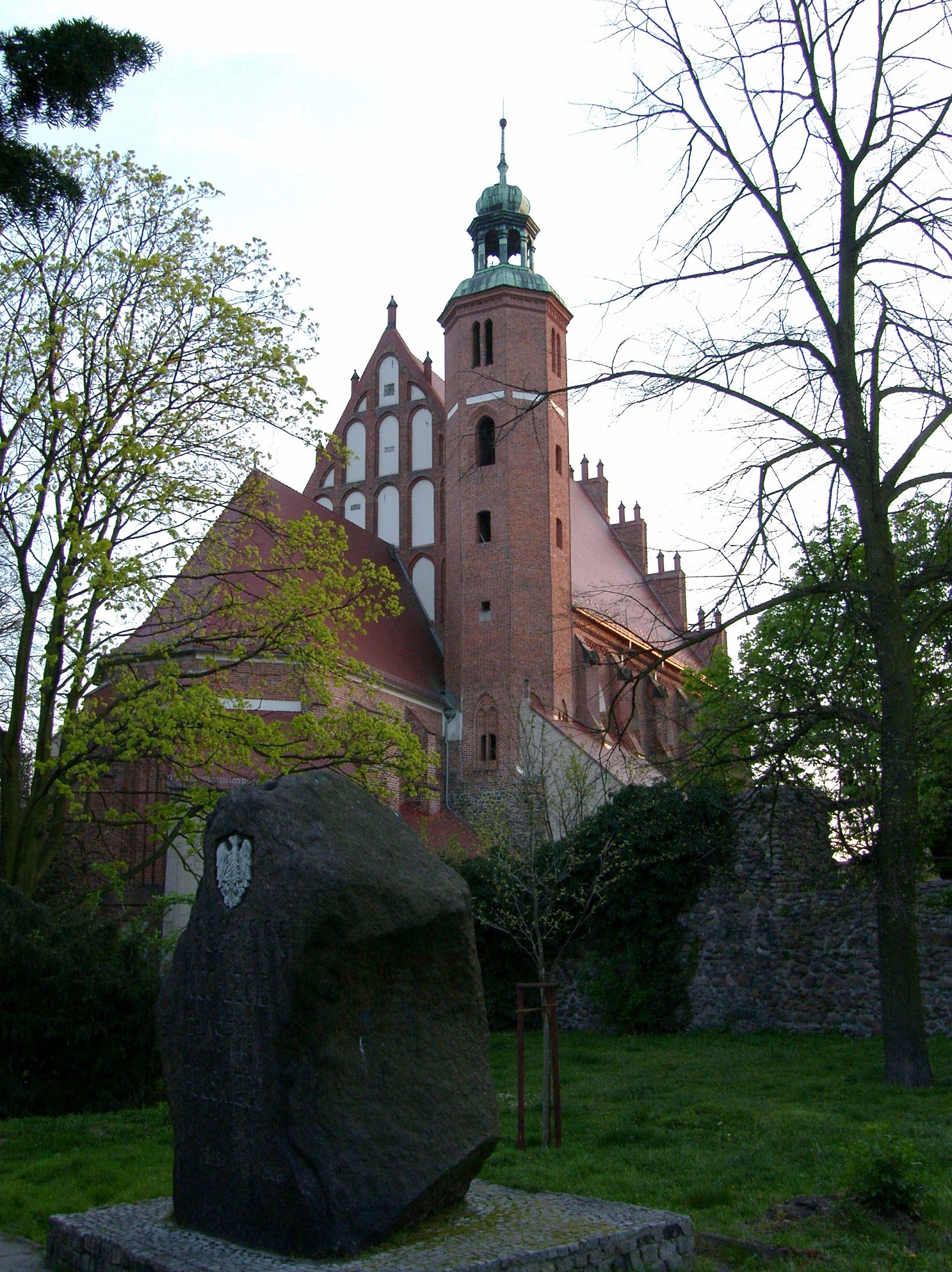
Church of the Sacred Heart of Jesus and fragments of the medieval defensive walls

Despite significant war damage, many interesting architectural historic sites have been preserved in Żary, including its medieval municipal urban arrangement.

- In the northwest part of the city there is the Dewins-Packs-Bibersteins' Castle, a huge, 13th-century structure, reconstructed later in the Renaissance style. It neighbors on the Baroque Promnitzs' Palace, which was designed by Swiss architect Giovanni Simonetti. Both residences, purchased by a private investor, continue to wait for renovation. They are surrounded by the remains of an old geometrical park, with a garden palace and the Blue Gate dating from 1708.
- * The Gothic Sacred Heart Church towers above the Old Town. The church, which obtained its principal shape in the 15th century, remembers the times when the city was chartered; fragments of the wall in the northern wing date from the 13th century. Initially it was a Roman Catholic church, then a Protestant Lutheran church from 1524 to 1945, when it became a Roman Catholic church again. The Baroque Promnitz Chapel near the eastern wall was added in 1670–1672. In the vicinity of the church we can find a Gothic rectory and a Gothic-Renaissance building of the old commissariat. Today it houses a museum.
- The garrison Church under the invocation of the Elevation of the Holy Cross build in the turn of the 14th/15th centuries; originally the church of Grey Friars
- Church under the invocation of St. Peter and Paul (13th century) located in the former cemetery

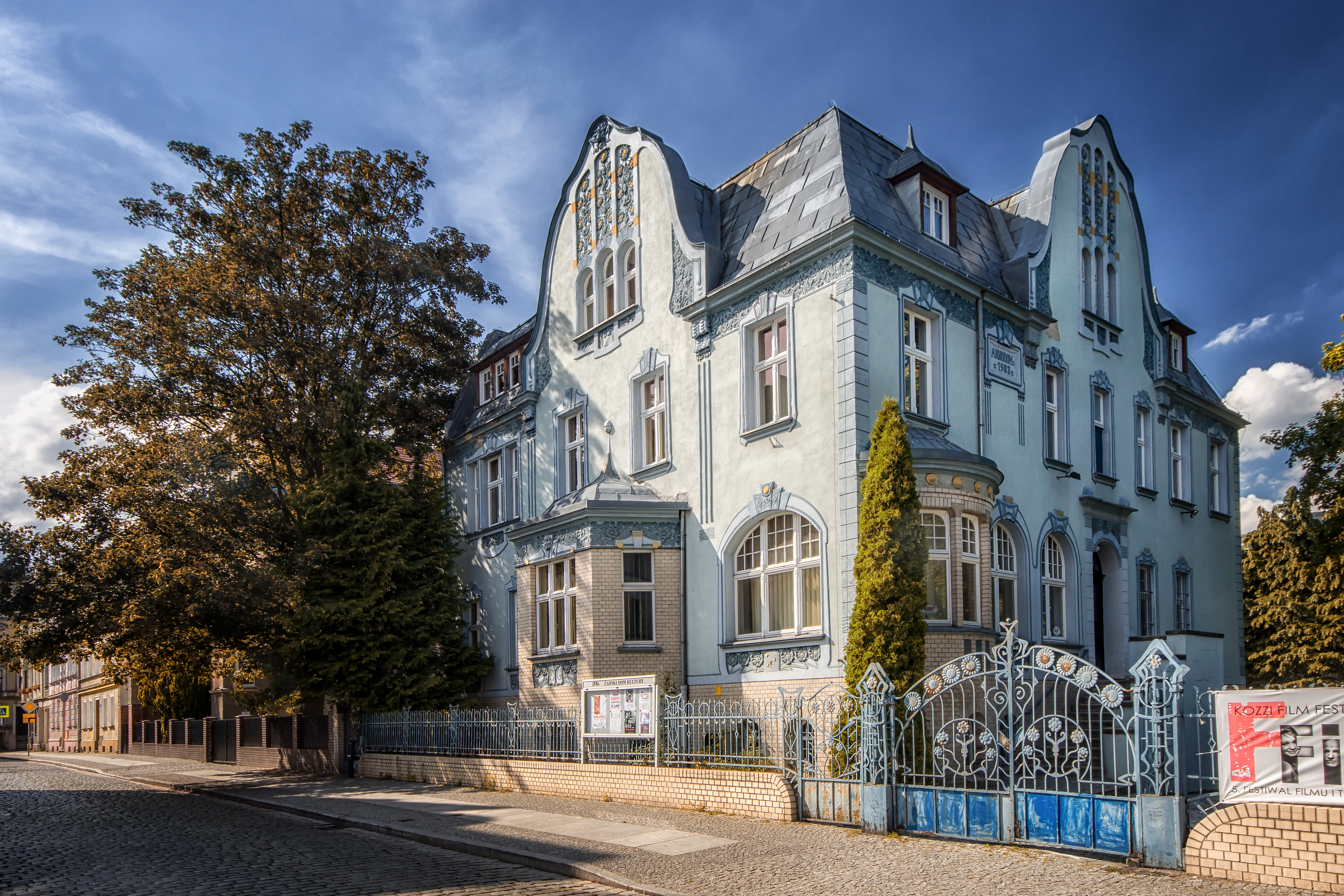
Żary Culture Center

- One of the main treasures of the Market Square is the newly renovated Town Hall dating from the turn of the 14th century, featuring a beautiful Renaissance portal. There are also tenement houses that surround the Market Square and some at Bolesława Chrobrego Street, which is a major commercial thoroughfare of the city. The oldest buildings date from the 17th century.
- The remains of the medieval fortifications of the city are fragments of walls, two defense towers (the taller one of the 14th/15th centuries, with ashlars made from meadow ore, has become a "landmark" of Żary), and a stone belfry from the turn of the 14th century.
- The Blue Gate build in 1708
- One of the tourist and natural attractions of the area is the "Green Forest" located near the southern border of the city, featuring the highest altitude in the Lubuski Region (227 m above sea level).

== Municipal projects ==
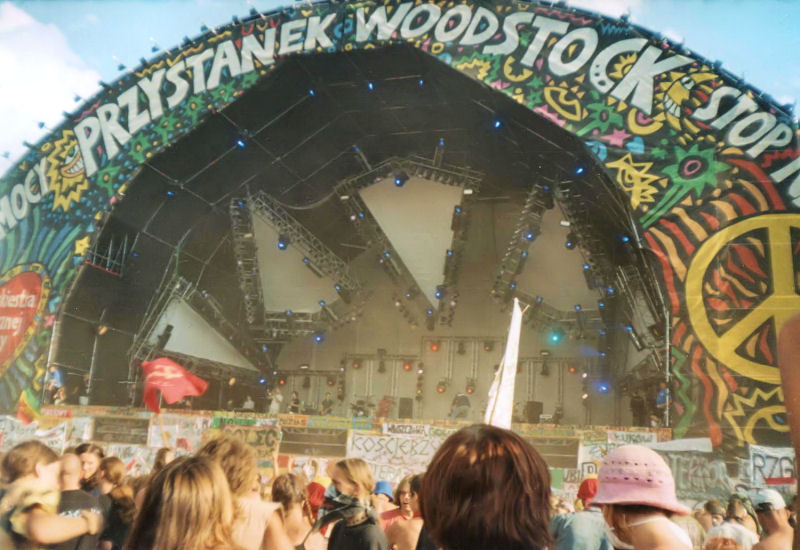
Woodstock Stop Festival 2003 in Żary

The Żary calendar of events includes many cultural festivals: in April the International Music Festival "Eurosilesia", in the beginning of June the city celebrates with pomp the Festival of Żary, in August there is the International Plein-air Painting and Sculpture Event, the International Festival of Street Theaters, in October the Vienna Music Festival, and in December the Telemann Youth Festival. For six years rock music concerts called "Woodstock Stop Festival" have been organized in Żary.

Żary invites to its new complex of indoor swimming pools called "Wodnik", featuring state-of-the-art fitness equipment. Other places in the city that offer pleasant atmosphere during meetings include myriad restaurants, cafes, and pubs. On the first Saturday of every month a flea market is held in the pedestrian precinct in Żary and the Exhibition Salon is located in the Żary pedestrian precinct near the Town Hall.

Thanks to an annual growth of revenues from local taxes and quick privatization of the municipal property, the community was able to finance several large-scale investment projects. The city has a sewage treatment plant with throughput of 15,000 cu. m per day, and a municipal landfill that meets the requirements of European standards. In 1998 a new water treatment plant was opened. Work continues on expansion of gas grid, heat distribution system, and water-sewage hookups.

In 2000 a large section of the bypass and a complex of indoor swimming pools were opened. Modernization of local roads is underway. In 2005 the last section of the bypass will be opened. Preparations continue on the revitalization of the Old Town of Żary. The pavement of the market square will soon be renovated. The projects of development of the town's pedestrian zone, park and the former military area.

The communication arrangement of the town is being modernized and expenses are being appropriated for the educational infrastructure. The construction of the sports and showroom is underway and junior high schools and primary schools are being redecorated. The community has benefited significantly from the funds of the European Union such as Phare CBC and Interreg.

== Education ==
There is one institution of higher education based in Żary:

- Łużycka Wyższa Szkoła Humanistyczna

== Sport ==
- Promień Żary – men's football team, 3rd league
- Unia Kunice – men's football team, 3rd league
- MLKS AGROS Żary – sports club; athletics and wrestling sections
- MKS Sokół Żary – women's volleyball (former 1st league) team

== Cuisine ==
The officially protected traditional food from Żary is kiełbasa żarska, a local type of kiełbasa (as designated by the Ministry of Agriculture and Rural Development of Poland).

== Notable people ==
- Basil Faber (1520–1576), Lutheran theologian
- Johann Crüger (1598–1662), German composer of Lutheran hymns
- Erdmann Neumeister (1671–1756), Preacher of Erdmann II Promnitz
- Christoph Friedrich Richter (1676–1711), German hymnwriter and entomologist
- Georg Philipp Telemann (1681–1767), German composer
- Friedrich von Wendt (1738–1818), German physician
- Christoph Christian Sturm (1740–1786), German preacher and author
- Gustav Fechner (1801–1887), German experimental psychologist, philosopher and physicist
- Ernst Kummer (1810–1893), German mathematician
- Maximilian Gritzner (1829–1902), German expert on heraldry
- Gustav von Oppen (1867–1918), commander of the Asia Corps
- Willy Jähde (1908–2002), Wehrmacht officer
- Friedrich Schoenfelder (1916–2011), German actor
- Tadeusz Ślusarski (1950–1998), Olympic gold and silver medalist in pole vault
- Józef Tracz (born 1964), wrestler (Greco-Roman style) who won three Olympic medals
- Mariusz Liberda (born 1976), footballer
- Andrzej Niedzielan (born 1979), footballer
- Sebastian Dudek (born 1980), footballer
- Andrzej Tychowski (born 1981), retired footballer
- Mateusz Lis (born 1997), footballer
- Janusz Rewiński, actor

== International relations ==
Żary is part of the Spree-Nysa-Bóbr Euroregion – a voluntary association of townships on both sides of the border. Apart from its twin towns, the city also develops relations with the borderland towns of Forst and Spremberg. In 2003 the 1st Level State Music School of Żary signed a cooperation agreement with a conservatory from Magdeburg. These are the only music schools named after composer G.P. Telemann.

=== Twin towns – sister cities ===
Żary is twinned with:

- Gárdony, Hungary (2009)
- Longuyon, France (2004)
- Weißwasser, Germany (1996)
