= Frieda Nugel =

German mathematician

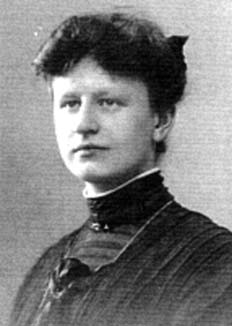
- Born: 18 June 1884; Cottbus, German Empire
- Died: 6 November 1966 (aged 82); Bad Godesberg, West Germany
- Scientific career
- Fields: Mathematics

Frieda Nugel (1884–1966) was a German mathematician and civil rights activist, and one of the first German women to earn a doctorate in mathematics. She earned her PhD at Martin Luther University of Halle-Wittenberg in 1912, under the supervision of August Gutzmer.

== Early life ==
Nugel was the fourth of six children of a musician, Friedrich Arthur Nugel. She was born on 18 June 1884 in Cottbus. She studied at the Mädchen-Mittelschule (Girl's Middle School) there until 1901, then began studies at the Höhere Mädchenschule (Girl's High School) until 1906. Shortly after, she completed the state teaching examination in Berlin. Returning to Cottbus, she worked as a private tutor for the Von Werdeck family, before taking the final level of German mathematics exams under the tutelage of Rudolf Tiemann.

== Career ==
In 1906 Nugel became certified as a teacher, and began working as a private instructor for the Werdeck family near Cottbus. After finishing her studies at the Luisenstädtische Oberschule (High School) in 1907, she started university studies in Berlin. She moved to Munich in 1909, and moved again to Halle in the same year. She took a position as a teacher at a girls' school in Cottbus, but taught there only for two years, until her marriage to Louis Hahn in 1914. The first of their four children was born in 1915. She moved with her husband to Altena and then Emden, her husband's home town, where he worked at his family's newspaper business. She taught intermittently at two schools there from 1914 to 1918, during World War I, but from then until 1927 she taught only privately, also publishing works promoting civil rights and better education for women.

In 1927, after the collapse of her husband's newspaper business, Nugel obtained a part-time position at a school in Emden. By 1930 her position there had become permanent, albeit at a smaller salary than the men in her school. The subjects she taught during this time included mathematics, physics, and German. Between 1939 and 1945 she witnessed the bombing of the city of Emden, as part of WWII, and the school was forced to move to Bad Wildungen; her two sons served as officers in the war, and were both killed in 1944.

Nugel retired in 1945 at the age of 61. Her husband died of an illness in 1952. In 1955, she moved to Bad Godesberg in order to connect with her remaining family. In 1962, the Faculty of Mathematics and Natural Sciences at Halle gave her a "Golden Doctoral Diploma" award, on the 50th anniversary of her 1912 dissertation. She died on 6 November 1966 in the town of Bad Godesberg.

== Published works ==
- Die Schraubenlinien. Eine monographische Darstellung (1912)
  - The helices. A monographic illustration., was Nugel's dissertation piece at the University of Halle-Wittenberg.
- Die deutsche Hausfrau und der Krieg (1916)
  - The German Housewife and the War details the German wife's struggle of maintaining the household during war times, while also pursuing their own personal life goals. Begins with a quote from Gertrud Bäumer, one of the leading figures in the German woman's movement.
- Frauenbewegung und Kinderemanzipation (1919)
  - The Women's Movement and Child Emancipation warns the women's movement against diluting their goals by taking on "strained aspirations", such as the children's emancipation movement.
- Die Frau in der Gemeindeverwaltung (1921)
  - The Woman in Local Administration calls for younger women to exercise their newly found right to vote, and educate themselves on candidates and political issues in order to make these decisions in a responsible and informed manner.
- Das Oberlyzeum (1924)
  - The Oberlyzeum was a manuscript for an essay to be put into a daily newspaper, expressing observations Nugel made as a teacher.
- Staat und Stadt Hamburg: Die dreijährige Grundschule vom Standpunkt der Mutter (1925)
  - State and City of Hamburg: The Primary School From a Mother's Standpoint was a piece detailing the pros and cons in the methods of transition from primary into secondary school.
