= Parseval–Gutzmer formula =

In mathematics, the Parseval–Gutzmer formula states that, if $f$ is an analytic function on a closed disk of radius r with Taylor series

$$f(z) = \sum^\infty_{k = 0} a_k z^k,$$

then for z = re^{iθ} on the boundary of the disk,

$$\int^{2\pi}_0 |f(re^{i\theta}) |^2 \, \mathrm{d}\theta = 2\pi \sum^\infty_{k = 0} |a_k|^2r^{2k},$$

which may also be written as

$$\frac{1}{2\pi }\int^{2\pi}_0 |f(re^{i\theta}) |^2 \, \mathrm{d}\theta = \sum^\infty_{k = 0} |a_k r^k|^2.$$

== Proof ==
The Cauchy Integral Formula for coefficients states that for the above conditions:

$$a_n = \frac{1}{2\pi i} \int^{}_{\gamma} \frac{f(z)}{z^{n+1}} \, \mathrm{d} z$$

where γ is defined to be the circular path around origin of radius r. Also for $x \in \Complex,$ we have: $\overline{x}{x} = |x|^2.$ Applying both of these facts to the problem starting with the second fact:

$$\begin{align}
\int^{2\pi}_0 \left |f \left (re^{i\theta} \right ) \right |^2 \, \mathrm{d}\theta &= \int^{2\pi}_0 f \left (re^{i\theta} \right ) \overline{f \left (re^{i\theta} \right )}  \, \mathrm{d}\theta\\[6pt]
&= \int^{2\pi}_0 f \left (re^{i\theta} \right )  \left (\sum^\infty_{k = 0} \overline{a_k \left (re^{i\theta} \right )^k} \right )  \, \mathrm{d}\theta && \text{Using Taylor expansion on the conjugate} \\[6pt]
&= \int^{2\pi}_0 f \left (re^{i\theta} \right )  \left (\sum^\infty_{k = 0} \overline{a_k} \left (re^{-i\theta} \right )^k \right )  \, \mathrm{d}\theta \\[6pt]
&= \sum^\infty_{k = 0} \int^{2\pi}_0 f \left (re^{i\theta} \right )  \overline{a_k} \left (re^{-i\theta} \right )^k \, \mathrm{d} \theta && \text{Uniform convergence of Taylor series} \\[6pt]
&= \sum^\infty_{k = 0} \left (2\pi \overline{a_k} r^{2k} \right ) \left (\frac{1}{2{\pi}i}\int^{2\pi}_0  \frac{f \left (re^{i\theta} \right )}{(r e^{i\theta})^{k+1}} {rie^{i\theta}} \right ) \mathrm{d}\theta \\
& = \sum^\infty_{k = 0} \left (2\pi \overline{a_k} r^{2k} \right ) a_k && \text{Applying Cauchy Integral Formula} \\
& = {2\pi} \sum^\infty_{k = 0} {|a_k|^2 r^{2k}}
\end{align}$$

== Further Applications ==
Using this formula, it is possible to show that

$$\sum^\infty_{k = 0} |a_k|^2r^{2k} \leqslant M_r^2$$

where

$$M_r = \sup\{|f(z)| : |z| = r\}.$$

This is done by using the integral

$$\int^{2\pi}_0 \left |f \left (re^{i\theta} \right ) \right |^2 \, \mathrm{d}\theta \leqslant 2\pi \left|\max_{\theta \in [0,2\pi)} \left (f \left (re^{i\theta} \right ) \right ) \right |^2 = 2\pi\left  |\max_{|z|=r}(f(z)) \right |^2 = 2\pi M_r^2$$
