= Promień Żary =

Polish football club

- Full name: Klub Sportowy Promień Żary
- Founded: 1 March 1946; 79 years ago
- Ground: Stadion MOSRiW
- Capacity: 2,000
- Chairman: Jerzy Styś
- Manager: Bartosz Siemiński
- League: IV liga Lubusz
- 2023–24: IV liga Lubusz, 12th of 18
- Website: http://www.promienzary.com/

KS Promień Żary (Polish pronunciation: [ˈprɔmjeɲ ˈʐarɨ]; Upper Sorbian: Pruha Žehliwy; Lower Sorbian: Prompjo Glut) is a football club based in Żary, Poland. They compete in the IV liga Lubusz, the fifth level of the Polish league system.
