= Friedrich Heinrich Albert Wangerin =

German mathematician

- Born: 18 November 1844; Greifenberg, Kingdom of Prussia
- Died: 25 October 1933 (aged 88); Halle, Germany
- Education: University of Halle-Wittenberg; University of Königsberg
- Known for: Research on potential theory, spherical functions and differential geometry Writing textbooks, encyclopaedias and his historical writings
- Scientific career
- Fields: Mathematician
- Workplaces: University of Berlin; University of Halle-Wittenberg
- Doctoral advisor: Franz Ernst Neumann

Friedrich Heinrich Albert Wangerin (18 November 1844 – 25 October 1933) was a German mathematician.

== Early life ==
Wangerin was born on 18 November 1844 in Greifenberg Pomerania, Prussia (now Gryfice, Poland). He studied at the gymnasium at Greifenberg and completed his final examination with an "excellent" grade in 1862.

In spring 1862, Wangerin entered the University of Halle-Wittenberg, where he studied Mathematics and Physics. He was taught by mathematicians Eduard Heine and Carl Neumann. In 1864 he moved to the University of Königsberg. He worked under the supervision of German mathematician Franz Ernst Neumann. He competed his doctorate from Königsberg University on 16 March 1866. His doctorate thesis was De annulis Newtonianis.

== Academic career ==
After he completing his doctorate, Wangerin took the examinations to become a school teacher. From 1866 to 1867, he trained at the Friedrichswerdersche Gymnasium, Berlin. From 1867 to 1876, he taught mathematics at several gymnasiums.

Wangerin became professor at the University of Berlin in 1876. He taught mathematics to the first year undergraduates. He left the University of Berlin in 1882 and became ordinary professor at the University of Halle-Wittenberg. The chair of ordinary professor had fallen vacant because of the death of Eduard Heine, the former teacher of Wangerin.

Wangerin held professorship at Halle for more than thirty five years. During the academic year 1910-11, he was rector of the university. He retired in 1919.

== Later life ==
After the retirement, Wangerin continued to live in Halle. He was active in mathematical research. He died on 25 October 1933 in Halle.

== Work ==
Wangerin was known for his research on potential theory, spherical functions and differential geometry. He wrote an important two volume treatise on potential theory and spherical functions. Theorie des Potentials und der Kugelfunktionen I was published in 1909 and Theorie des Potentials und der Kugelfunktionen II was published in 1921. He studied Wangerin functions.

Wangerin was also known for writing of textbooks, encyclopaedias and his historical writings. In 1904, he wrote Theorie der Kugelfunktionen und der verwandten Funktionen, insbesondere der Laméschen und Besselschen (Theorie spezieller, durch lineare Differentialgleichungen definierter Funktionen) on functions such as Lamé function and Bessel function for the Encyklopädie der mathematischen Wissenschaften. In 1909, he wrote an article on optics (Optik ältere Theorie) for the physics volume of the same encyclopaedia.

Wangerin also played an important role in the reviewing of mathematical papers. From 1869 to 1921, he was coeditor of Fortschritte der Mathematik.

== Honors ==
Wangerin was elected to the German Academy of Scientists Leopoldina in 1883. From 1906 to 1921, he served as President of the Academy. In 1907, he was awarded an honorary degree from Uppsala University. He received many medals, including the 1922 Cothenius medal from the German Academy of Scientists Leopoldina.
