= Motorways and expressways in Poland =

Polish highway network: Completed Opened with temporary organization Closed (construction finished) Construction Construction suspended Design (as part of design-build) Offered to construction companies Environmental decision obtained Planned

Planned network defined by the ministry ordinance (Note: Note: it does not include some sections in the preplanning phase which are not officially included in the ordinance.)

Development of the highway network in Poland since 1932: Completed Under construction Planned

Total length of highways by year

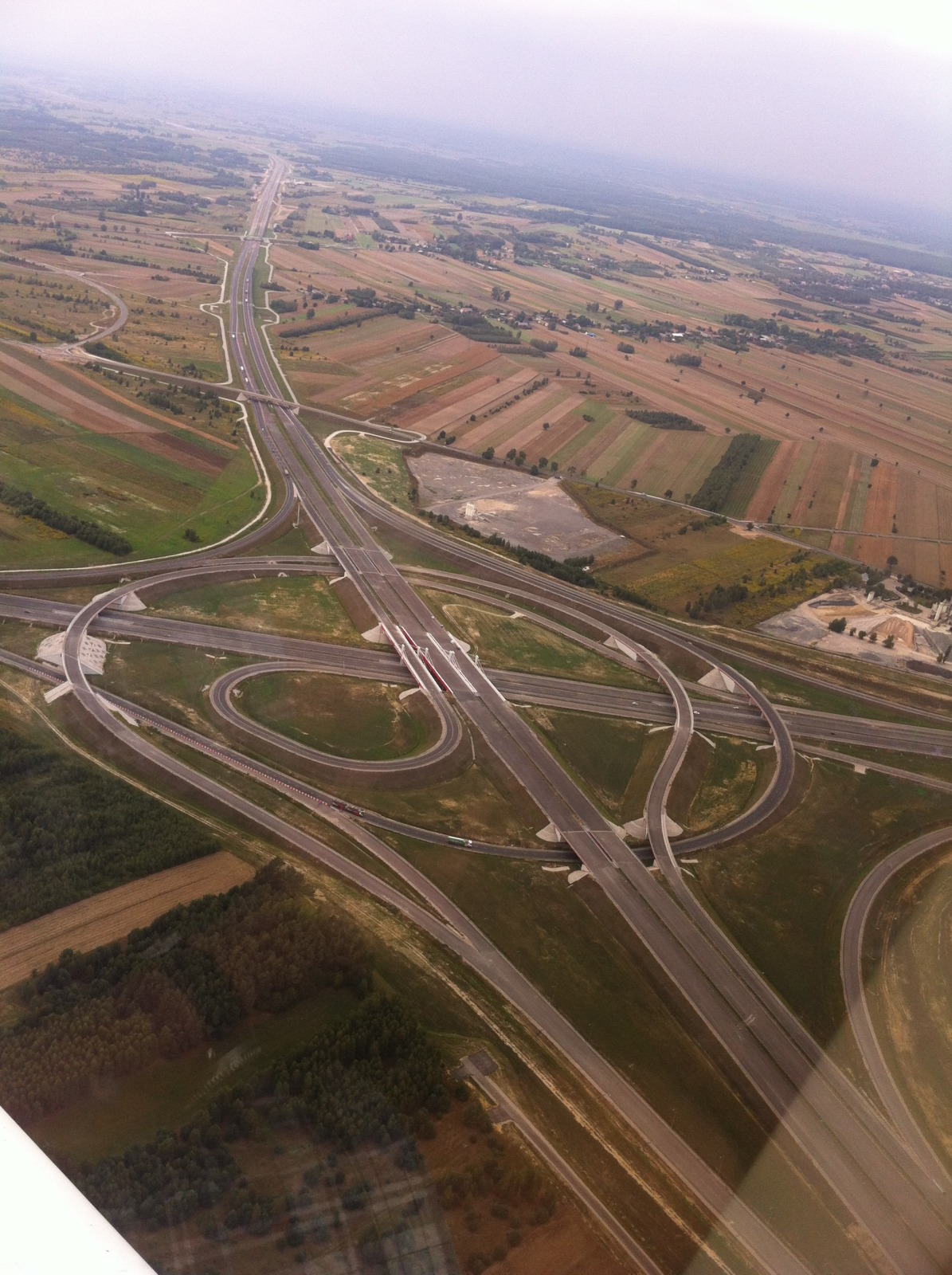
A1/A2 Łódź Północ interchange

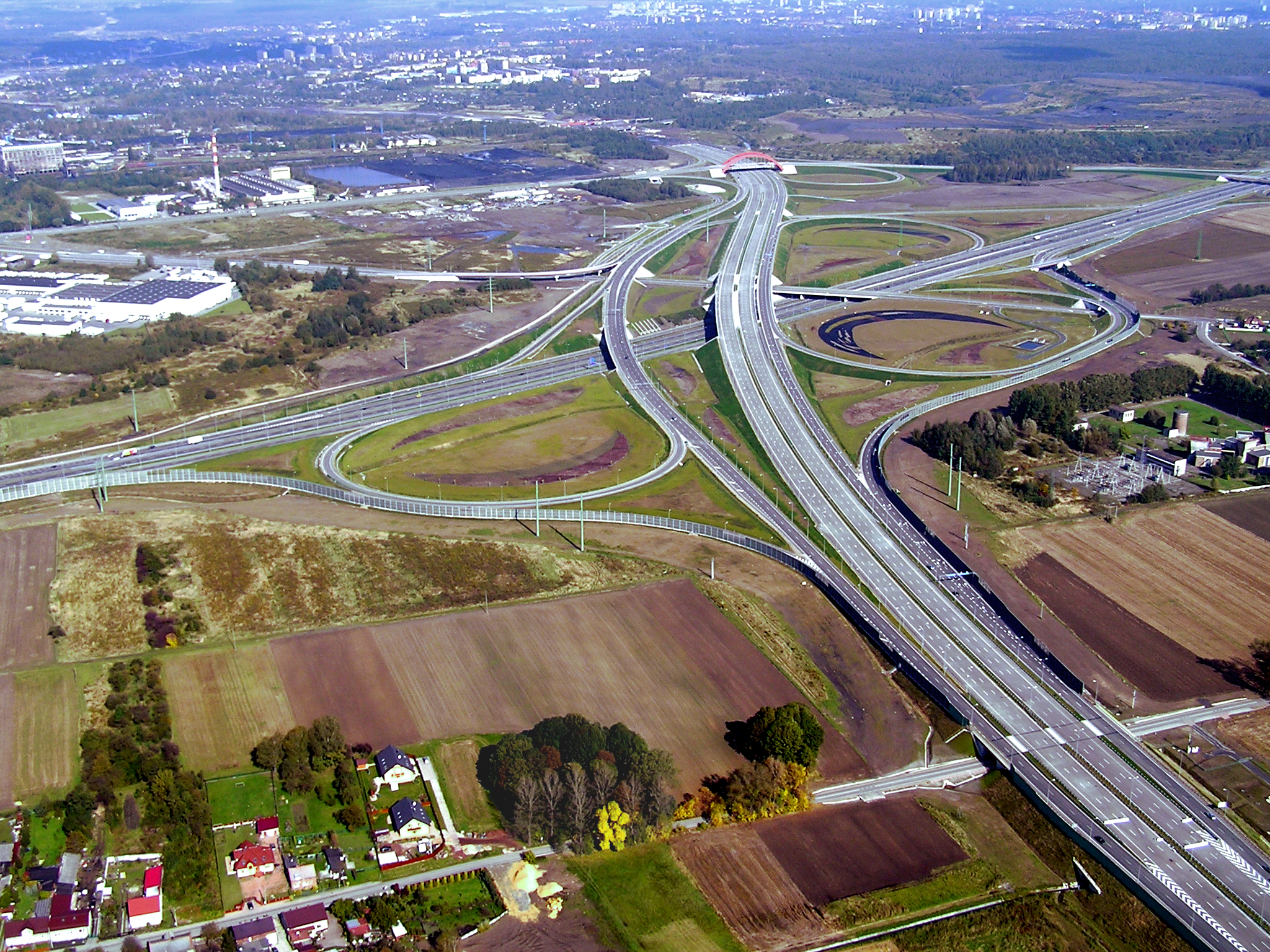
A1/A4 Gliwice Sośnica interchange

Motorways and expressways in Poland are controlled-access highways in the network of Poland's national roads. They feature grade-separated interchanges with all other roads, emergency lanes, feeder lanes, wildlife crossings and dedicated roadside rest areas. Motorways differ from expressways in their technical parameters like designated speed, permitted road curvature, lane widths or minimal distances between interchanges. Moreover, expressways might have single-carriageway sections in case of low traffic densities (as of 2026, such sections constitute 3% of the highway network).

The development of controlled-access highways began in the 1970s, but proceeded very slowly under the communist rule and for the first years afterwards: between 1970 and 2000 only 434 km of highways (5% of the planned network) were constructed in total. Further 1050 km (13% of the network) were opened from 2001 to 2010, followed by 2773 km (34% of the network) constructed between 2011 and 2020. It is planned to open about 2450 km (30%) in the 2020s, while the last about 1500 km (18%) would be completed in the 2030s.

As of October 2026, there are 5,596.1 km of motorways and expressways in operation (68% of the intended network), while contracts for construction of a further 1022 km (13% of the network) are ongoing.

Except for the single-carriageway expressway sections, both types of highways fulfill the definition of a motorway as specified by OECD, WRA or Vienna Convention. Speed limits in Poland are 140 km/h on motorways and 120 km/h on expressways (100 km/h for single-carriageway expressway sections). Some motorway stretches are tolled.

== Technical parameters ==
- Motorways (Polish: autostrada) are public roads with controlled access that are designated for motor vehicles only, and feature two carriageways with at least two continuous lanes each, divided by a median. They have no single-level intersections with any roads or other forms of land and water transport, and have wildlife crossings constructed above the road. They feature emergency lanes and feeder lanes, and are equipped with dedicated roadside rest areas. Motorways are the only roads in Poland that use a blue background on road signs; others use green road signs.
- Expressways (Polish: droga ekspresowa) share most of the characteristics of motorways, differing mainly in that:
1. Expressways are designated for lower speed than motorways. For example, the road curvature can be more severe and the lanes are usually narrower (3.5 m vs 3.75 m). Emergency lanes are also narrower (2.5 m vs 3 m) and in exceptional situations expressways might not have them at all.
2. Expressways can have a single carriageway on sections with low traffic density.
3. Motorways can have interchanges only with main roads, and the distance between interchanges is typically not less than 15 km (or 5 km near major cities), while expressways typically have more frequent interchanges. In exceptional situations, expressways might not have dedicated feeder lanes on interchanges.

== List of motorways and expressways ==
In 2004, the government published the ordinance defining the planned highway network of length about 7,200 km (4,474 mi). Notable changes introduced in later amendments include re-routing S8 and adding S61 instead (a change related to the Rospuda Valley conflict), introducing S16, S52 and A/S50, as well as extending S5, S8 and S10, raising the total length to about 8,200 km (5,095 mi). The planned network consists of 16 major highways (over 200 km of intended length each): A1, S3, S5, S7, S11, S17, S19, S61 running north to south and A2/S2, A4, S6/A6, S8/A8, S10, S12, S16, S74 running west to east, as well as 9 shorter highways. (Note: Major changes in the network (e.g. opening new fragments of roads, signing all contracts for a planned road section) are accounted continuously, while a general update including all the details is done once per year (last: 1 January 2026). 'In total' length statistic is kept consistent as of the last general update, and might hence not be the exact sum of the current state of the table.) (Note: Some highways can overlap. The table shows data without overlapping sections such that each fragment is counted exactly once, in accordance with how they are attributed in the ministry ordinance, i.e. each common section is attributed to the road with the lower number (in case of two expressways overlapping) or to a motorway (in case of a motorway and an expressway overlapping), except for S12/S17 west of Lublin which is recorded as S17 in the sources.)

Completed highways
Sign	Route	Location	Total length	Existing		Years of opening
A1	Gdańsk (S6) - Grudziądz (S5) - Toruń (S10) - Łódź (A2/S8) - Katowice Airport (S1) - Gliwice (A4) - (Poland) / (Czech Republic) (Ostrava)		566.6 km	566.6 km	100%	2007 – 2022 (Note: First sections opened in 1976 as a dual carriageway road with at-grade intersections and pedestrian crossings (65 km) and 1989 as a short motorway fragment (17 km). In 2019 – 2022, they were reconstructed into a modern motorway.)
S3	Świnoujście (/ (Sweden) Ystad) - Szczecin (A6) - Gorzów Wlkp. - A2 - Zielona Góra - Legnica (A4) - (Poland) / (Czech Republic) (Prague)		454.9 km	454.9 km of which 3 km near the Czech border remain closed until connecting D11 is constructed	100%	2010 – 2025 (Note: The 1st carriageway on three sections (62 km in total) was opened in 1995 – 2008.)
A4	(Poland) / (Germany) (Dresden) - Legnica (S3) - Wrocław (A8) - Opole - Gliwice (A1) - Katowice (S1) - Kraków (S7) - Rzeszów (S19) - (Poland) / (Ukraine) (Lviv)		669 km	669 km of which 103 km substandard: no hard shoulder	100%	1983 – 2016
S14	Łódź western bypass (A2 – S8)	Łódź	40.2 km	40.2 km of which 0.5 km substandard: at-grade roundabout	100%	2012 – 2023
A18	(Poland) / (Germany) (Berlin) – Krzyżowa (A4)		76.5 km	76.5 km of which 5.6 km substandard: no hard shoulder	100%	2006, 2022/2023 (Note: The southern carriageway was constructed between 1935 and 1938 by Nazi Germany. The northern carriageway was constructed alongside it between 2004 and 2006, but the road was not marked as a motorway (except for a short fragment with both carriageways reconstructed), as only the west-bound traffic could use the motorway-quality carriageway, while the east-bound traffic kept using the old carriageway with concrete slabs from the 1930s. The southern carriageway was reconstructed to modern motorway standard between 2020 and 2023 and the whole route was then designated as a motorway.)
S22	Elbląg – (Poland) /Kaliningrad Oblast		52.2 km	52.2 km single carriageway	50%	2008 (Note: In place of a largely destroyed Nazi German motorway (also single-carriageway) from the 1930s.)
S51	Olsztyn (S16) – Olsztynek (S7)		20.3 km	20.3 km	100%	2012, 2019
Expressway S52 (Poland)	Kraków northern bypass (A4 – S7)	Kraków	18.3 km	18.3 km	100%	1986 – 2024
S61	Ostrów Mazowiecka (S8) - Łomża - Ełk (S16) - Suwałki - (Poland) / (Lithuania) (Kaunas) (Via Baltica)		213.5 km	213.5 km	100%	2019 – 2025 (Note: Short fragments (town bypasses), partially only with the 1st carriageway, were opened in 2013 – 2015.)
S79	Warsaw – airport – S2	Warsaw	4.8 km	4.8 km	100%	2013
S86	Katowice – Sosnowiec	Upper Silesia	5.9 km	5.9 km	100%	1985
Major completed sections
A2 S2	Main section: (Poland) / (Germany) (Berlin) - S3 - Poznań (S5/S11) - Łódź (A1/S14) - Warsaw (S7/S8/S17) - Międzyrzec P. (S19)		598.9 km (Note: Aggregate length for A2/S2: 657.1 km (95% completed))	564.1 km of which 92 km reconstruction (Łódź - Warsaw): widening to 2x3 lanes (2 lanes per direction are open on the whole reconstruction site); 2 km (border crossing): tender for reconstruction to full motorway standard 34.8 km	100%	1985 – 1988, 2003 – 2013, 2020 – 2026
S5	Main section: Grudziądz (A1) - Bydgoszcz (S10) - Poznań (A2/S11) - Wrocław (A8)		340.3 km (Note: Aggregate length for S5 including Ostróda and Bolków extensions (added to the plans in 2015/2019): 492.3 km (70.3% completed))	340.3 km	100%	2012 – 2022 (Note: The 1st carriageway on three short sections (town bypasses) was opened in 1998 – 2006.)
S6 A6	Primary route: (Note: The national road 6 is currently routed through the Szczecin Southern Bypass (motorway A6) and then through expressway S6. After the planned completion of the Szczecin Western Bypass in 2033, S6 will get rerouted to incorportate this section. It is not clear whether A6 then retains its number, creating two parallel routes with number 6, or a renumbering takes place.) (Poland) / (Germany) (Berlin) - Szczecin (S3/S10) - Koszalin (S11) - Gdynia (S7) - Gdańsk (A1)		361.2 km (Note: Aggregate length for A6 and S6 including Szczecin western bypass: 412 km (87.7% completed))	333.1 km 28.1 km	100%	1977 – 2001, 2019 – 2026 (Note: A6 near Szczecin was constructed by Nazi Germany in 1934 – 1938 and then reconstructed into the contemporary motorway, with the subsequent sections completed in the modern standard in 1999, 2007 and 2021. Two bypasses on S6 – of Nowogard and Słupsk (partially with the first carriageway only) – were opened in 2010/2011.)
S8 A8	Main section: Wrocław (A4) - Łódź (A1) - Piotrków T. - Warsaw (A2/S7) - Ostrów M. (S61) - Białystok (S19)		548.2 km (Note: Aggregate length for S8 including Kłodzko extension (added to plans in 2019): 616 km (87.5% completed))	525.5 km 22.7 km	100%	2008 – 2019 (Note: Short fragments (town bypasses) constructed earlier in the 2000s.)
S17	Main section: Warsaw (A2) – Lublin (S12/S19)		150 km (Note: Aggregate length for S17: 322.5 km (57% completed))	150 km	100%	2013 – 2020

Highways under construction
Sign	Route	Location	Total length	Existing		Construction commenced (Note: Sections under active construction and sections under a joint Design & Build contract.)	Of which under active construction	Scheduled years of opening		Tender	In preparation (Note: Design phase, if it is being conducted as a part of the predesign process rather than as a part of a design-build contract. Late predesign phase, i.e. after having obtained environmental decision (0–2 years to finish). In the process of obtaining environmental decision (including if a non-final decision has been issued and is being appealed from). Early predesign phase aimed to determine the highway's route (Polish: Studium Korytarzowe, STEŚ).)
S1	Katowice Airport (A1) - Mysłowice (A4) - Bielsko-Biała (S52) - (Poland) / (Slovakia) (Žilina)		144 km	113.3 km + 20.7 km single carriageway	83.9% (91%)	10 km (new route)		2027			
S1	Katowice Airport (A1) - Mysłowice (A4) - Bielsko-Biała (S52) - (Poland) / (Slovakia) (Žilina)		144 km	(+ 39.5 km) alternative dual-carriageway road	(100%)	10 km (new route)		2027			
A2	Eastern section: Międzyrzec P. (S19) – (Poland) / (Belarus) (Minsk) (Note: The motorway will terminate its course about 7 km (4.3 mi) away from the Belarusian border, where the traffic will get split into national road 2 to the border terminal for private cars, national road 68 to the border terminal for freight traffic, and a planned new road to the Małaszewicze Cargo Terminal)		52.2 km	26.7 km	51.1%	25.5 km		2029, 2030			
S6	Szczecin western bypass (A6 – S3)	Szczecin	50.8 km	0 km	0%	50.8 km		2028, 2029, tunnel: 2033			
S7	Gdynia - Gdańsk (A1) - Elbląg (S22) - Olsztynek (S51) - Warsaw (S8)		approx. 750 km	352.2 km	93.9%	9 km (reconstruction of the 2×2 road to 2×3 highway; 2 lanes per each direction are open to traffic on the whole length of the reconstruction site)		2027, 2032?			13 km (reconstruction + new route)
S7	Gdynia - Gdańsk (A1) - Elbląg (S22) - Olsztynek (S51) - Warsaw (S8)		approx. 750 km	(+ 22 km) dual carriageway road	(100%)	9 km (reconstruction of the 2×2 road to 2×3 highway; 2 lanes per each direction are open to traffic on the whole length of the reconstruction site)		2027, 2032?			13 km (reconstruction + new route)
S7	Warsaw (S2) - Radom (S12) - Kielce (S74) - Kraków (A4)		approx. 750 km	281.3 km + 0.4 km 1st carriageway	99.9%	0.4 km 2nd carriageway		2026			
S7	Warsaw (S2) - Radom (S12) - Kielce (S74) - Kraków (A4)		approx. 750 km	of which 1.2 km substandard: S7/S52 interchange not fully operational	(100%)	0.4 km 2nd carriageway		2026			
S7	Kraków (A4) - Rabka-Zdrój - (Poland) / (Slovakia) (Martin) (Note: The road is planned to be constructed with expressway parameters and dual-carriageway profile at least up to Jabłonka (8 km away from the Slovak border). It is being considered whether the last 8 kilometers would also be constructed with expressway parameters or in a lower standard (with at-grade intersections and/or single-carriageway profile), which might depend on the traffic forecasts and the decisions regarding the planned standard of the cross-border connection to R3 in Slovakia.)		approx. 750 km	31.8 km	34.6%	partial reconstruction to grade-separated (2 lanes in southbound direction and 1 lane in northbound direction are open to traffic)		2031?, 2033?, 2040? (Note: The section from Rabka-Zdrój (current terminus of S7) to the Slovak border is planned to get completed by 2033. From Kraków (A4) to Myślenice (current beginning of S7) the existing dual-carriageway DK7 is gradually geting upgraded with the aim of removing all at-grade intersections and pedestrian crossings by 2031. A separate expressway route would be constructed on this section around 2040, as the last fragment of the currently-planned highway network.)			approx. 60 km (new route)
S7	Kraków (A4) - Rabka-Zdrój - (Poland) / (Slovakia) (Martin)		approx. 750 km	(+ 25 km) dual carriageway road	(62%)	partial reconstruction to grade-separated (2 lanes in southbound direction and 1 lane in northbound direction are open to traffic)		2031?, 2033?, 2040?			approx. 60 km (new route)
S8	Southern section: Wrocław (A8) - Kłodzko - (Poland) / (Czech Republic) (Brno)		approx. 127.4 km	5.1 km	4%	68.8 km	32 km	2027, 2028, 2029, 2037?			approx. 53.5 km
S10	Main section: Szczecin (A6) - Piła (S11) - Bydgoszcz (S5) - Toruń (A1)		297 km	50.2 km + 17.5 km 1st carriageway	19.8%	153 km + 17.5 km 2nd carriageway	45.4 km	2027, 2028, 2030?, 2031?		37.8 km	39.5 km
S11	Koszalin (S6) - Piła (S10) - Poznań (A2/S5) - Kępno (S8) - Piekary Śląskie (A1)		556.5 km	154.4 km + 10.5 km 1st carriageway	28.7%	122.1 km + 4.2 km 2nd carriageway	25 km + 4.2 km 2nd carriageway	2026, 2028, 2029, 2031?, 2033?		78.4 km	145.1 km + 6.3 km 2nd c/w
S11	Koszalin (S6) - Piła (S10) - Poznań (A2/S5) - Kępno (S8) - Piekary Śląskie (A1)		556.5 km	154.4 km + 10.5 km 1st carriageway	28.7%	122.1 km + 4.2 km 2nd carriageway	25 km + 4.2 km 2nd carriageway	2026, 2028, 2029, 2031?, 2033?		78.4 km	+ 46 km
S12	Eastern section: Lublin (S17/S19) - Chełm - (Poland) / (Ukraine) (Kyiv)		103.7 km	29.2 km	28.2%	68.8 km		2027, 2028, 2032?			5.7 km
Expressway S16 (Poland)	Olsztyn (S51) - Ełk (S61)		163.5 km	46.2 km + 20.1 km 1st carriageway	34.4%	19.7 km + 20.1 km 2nd carriageway		2028, 2034?			77.5 km
S17	Eastern section: Lublin (S12/S19) - Zamość - (Poland) / (Ukraine) (Lviv)		126 km	9.6 km + 2 km 1st carriageway	8.4%	92 km	47.7 km	2027, 2028, 2030?, 2nd c/w: 2035?		22.3 km	2 km 2nd carriageway
Via Carpatia	(Poland) / (Belarus) (Minsk) - Białystok (S8) - Międzyrzec P. (A2) - Lublin (S12/S17)		572.5 km	31.2 km + 18.5 km 1st carriageway	12.7%	198.7 km + 18.5 km 2nd carriageway	174.6 km + 18.5 km 2nd carriageway	2026, 2027, 2028, 2030?, 2031?		32 km	37.4 km
Via Carpatia	Lublin (S12/S17) – Rzeszów (A4)		572.5 km	141.7 km + 16.3 km 1st carriageway with interchanging 2+1 lanes	94.8% (100%)	16.3 km 2nd carriageway		2026			
Via Carpatia	Rzeszów (A4) – (Poland) / (Slovakia) (Košice)		572.5 km	32.1 km	33.2%	64.5 km	38.8 km	2026, 2027, 2028 tunnels: 2028, 2030, 2031			
S74	Łódź (A1) - Sulejów (S12) - Kielce (S7) - Nisko (S19)		approx. 261 km	16.7 km	6.4%	98.6 km	18.7 km	2027, 2028, 2029, 2032?, 2033?, 2034?			92 km
S74	Łódź (A1) - Sulejów (S12) - Kielce (S7) - Nisko (S19)		approx. 261 km	16.7 km	6.4%	98.6 km	18.7 km	2027, 2028, 2029, 2032?, 2033?, 2034?			+ approx. 54 km
Planned highways
Sign	Route	Location	Total length	Existing		Construction commenced	Of which under active construction	Tender	Predesign complete	In preparation	Planned completion
S5	Eastern section: Ostróda (S7) – Grudziądz (A1)		101.8 km	14.3 km	14%					87.5 km	2033
S5	Western section: Bolków (S3) – Świdnica – S8		50.2 km	0 km	0%					50.2 km	2032
S10	Eastern section: Włocławek (A1) - Płock - Warsaw (S7)		120.4 km	0 km	0%					120.4 km	2033
S12	Western section: Piotrków Tryb. (A1) - Sulejów (S74) - Radom (S7) - Lublin (S17)		185 km	16.4 km + 6.0 km 1st carriageway	10.7%	29.1 km		13.2 km		120.3 km + 6.0 km 2nd c/w	2033
S17	Warsaw eastern bypass (S8 – S2)	Warsaw	17.3 km	3.5 km	20.2%					13.8 km	2036
A50	CPK (A2) - Mińsk M. (A2) - CPK	Warsaw (2nd ring road)	approx. 265 km	0 km	0%					approx. 100 km approx. 165 km	2040
Expressway S52 (Poland)	(Poland) / (Czech Republic) (Olomouc) - Cieszyn - Bielsko-Biała (S1) - Wadowice - Głogoczów (S7)		98 km	37 km	37.8%					61 km	2032
In total
Planned length				Existing		Construction commenced	Of which under active construction	Tender	Predesign complete	In preparation	No progress
Total	approx. 8,160 km (5,070 mi)	approx. 2080 km approx. 6080 km		5305.2 km + 149.8 km 1st carriageway	65.21%	1049.4 km + 62.5 km 2nd carriageway	501.3 km + 30.4 km 2nd carriageway	265.6 km	0 km	approx. 1442.7 km + 14.3 km 2nd carriageway	73 km 2nd c/w (Note: Single carriageway expressways which are currently not planned for widening to dual carriageways: 52.2 km of S22, 20.8 km of S1)

=== Cross-sections ===
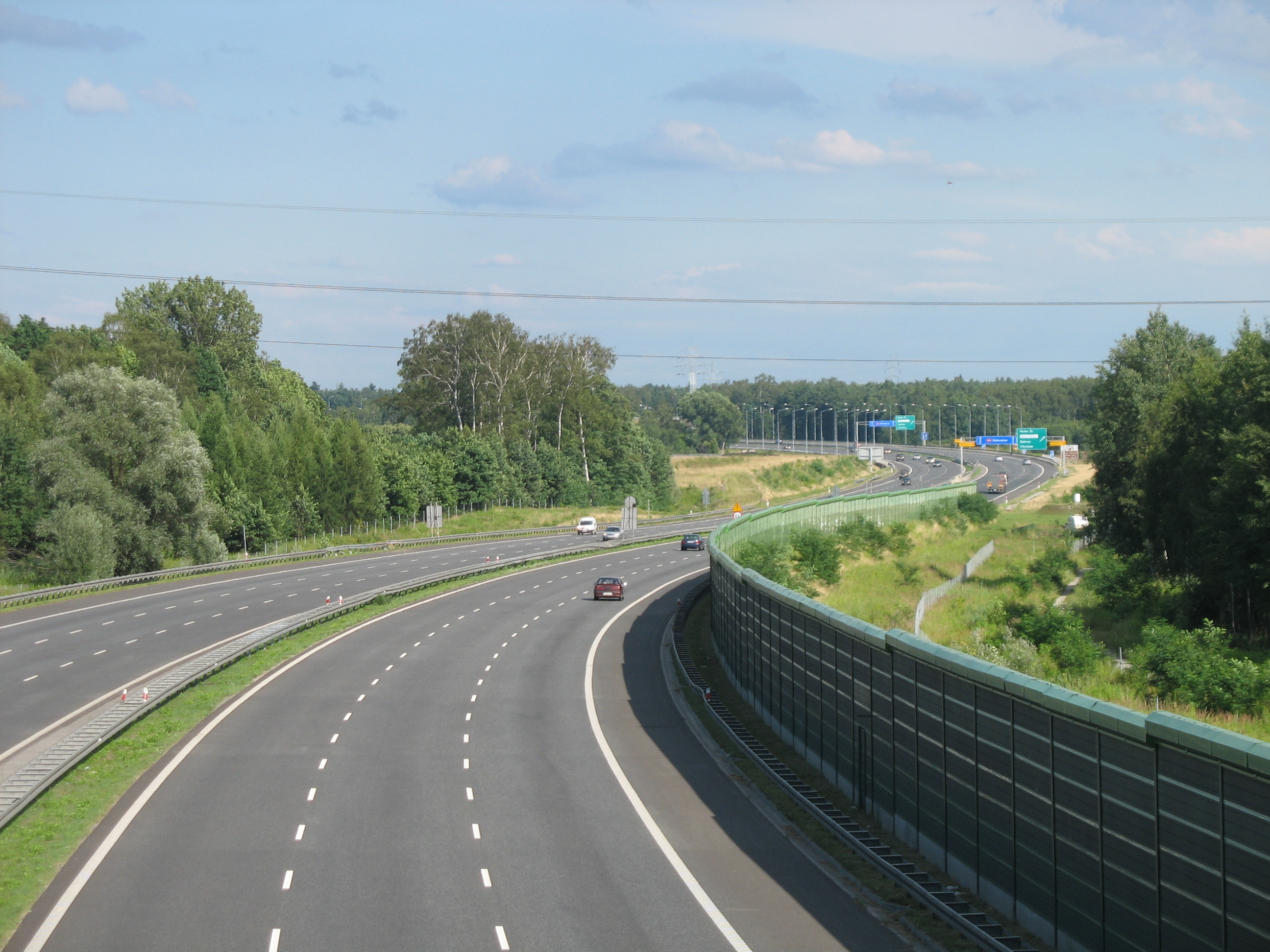
A4 in Zabrze: section with 2×3 lanes

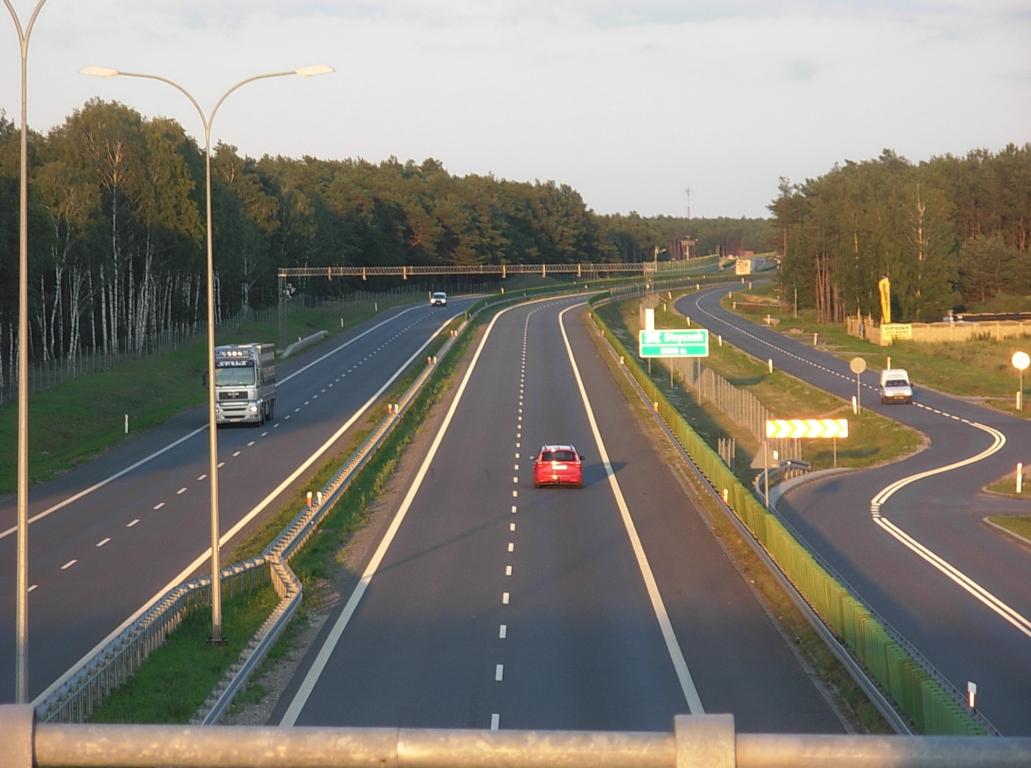
S5 near Bydgoszcz with 2×2 lanes: the most common highway type

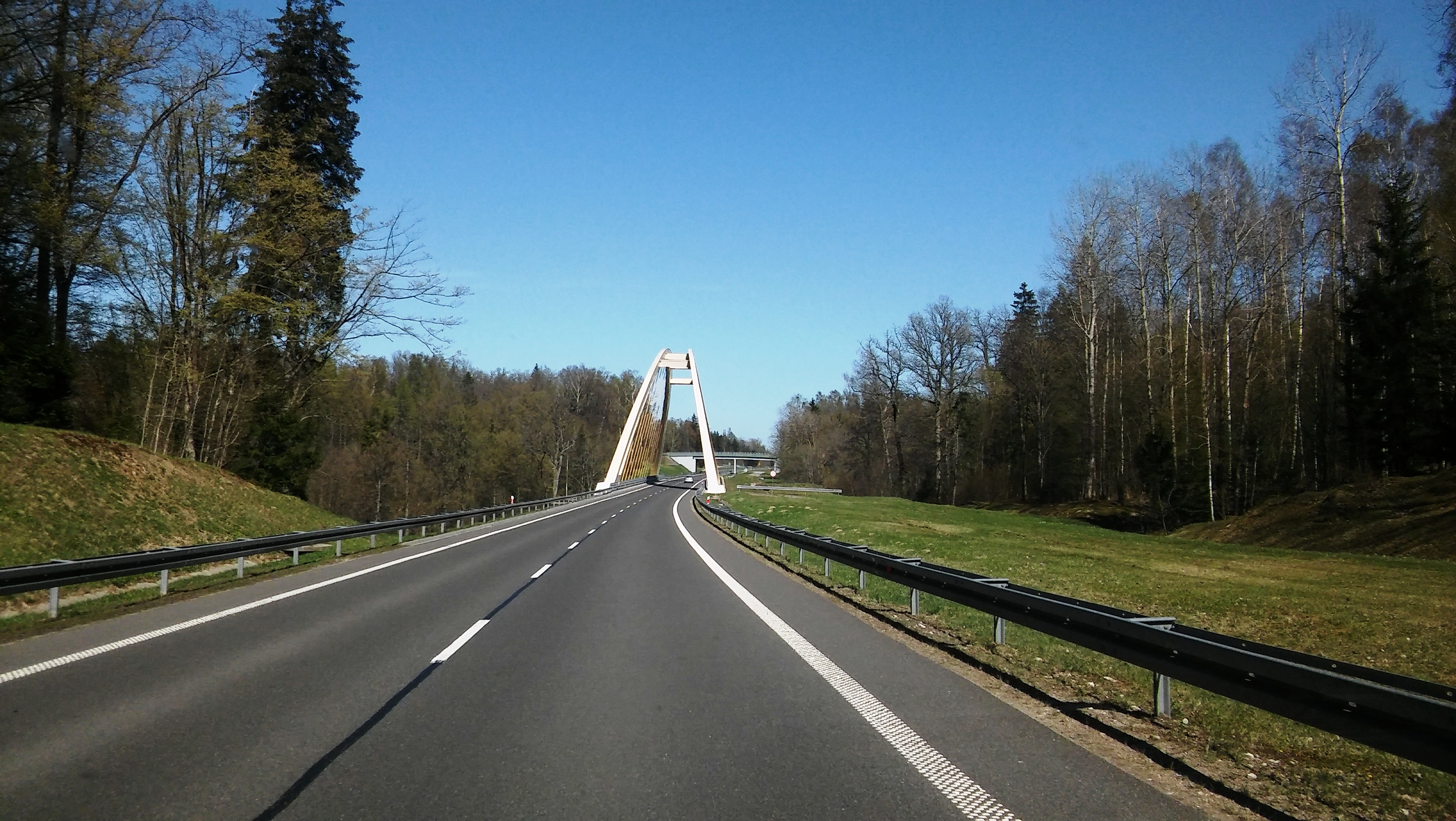
S22 near Kaliningrad Oblast border: a single-carriageway expressway; space reservation for the 2nd carriageway can be seen on the right

As of 1st November 2026, the operational sections of highways feature the following cross-sections:

- 7% (398 km) – motorways and expressways with 2×3 or (occasionally) 2×4 or more lanes,
- 90% (5062 km) – motorways and expressways with 2×2 lanes,
- 3% (149 km) – single-carriageway expressways, of which 55 km with dual-carriageway fragments (2×2) around the interchanges.

All single-carriageway expressways are constructed with allocated space for a possible upgrade to a dual-carriageway and all bridges above such highways are prepared to accommodate the second carriageway. Most of those sections are planned to be widened to full profile by 2033, the exceptions being S1 (near the Slovak border) and S22 (near the Kaliningrad Oblast border) where widening is currently not expected.

=== Substandard highways ===
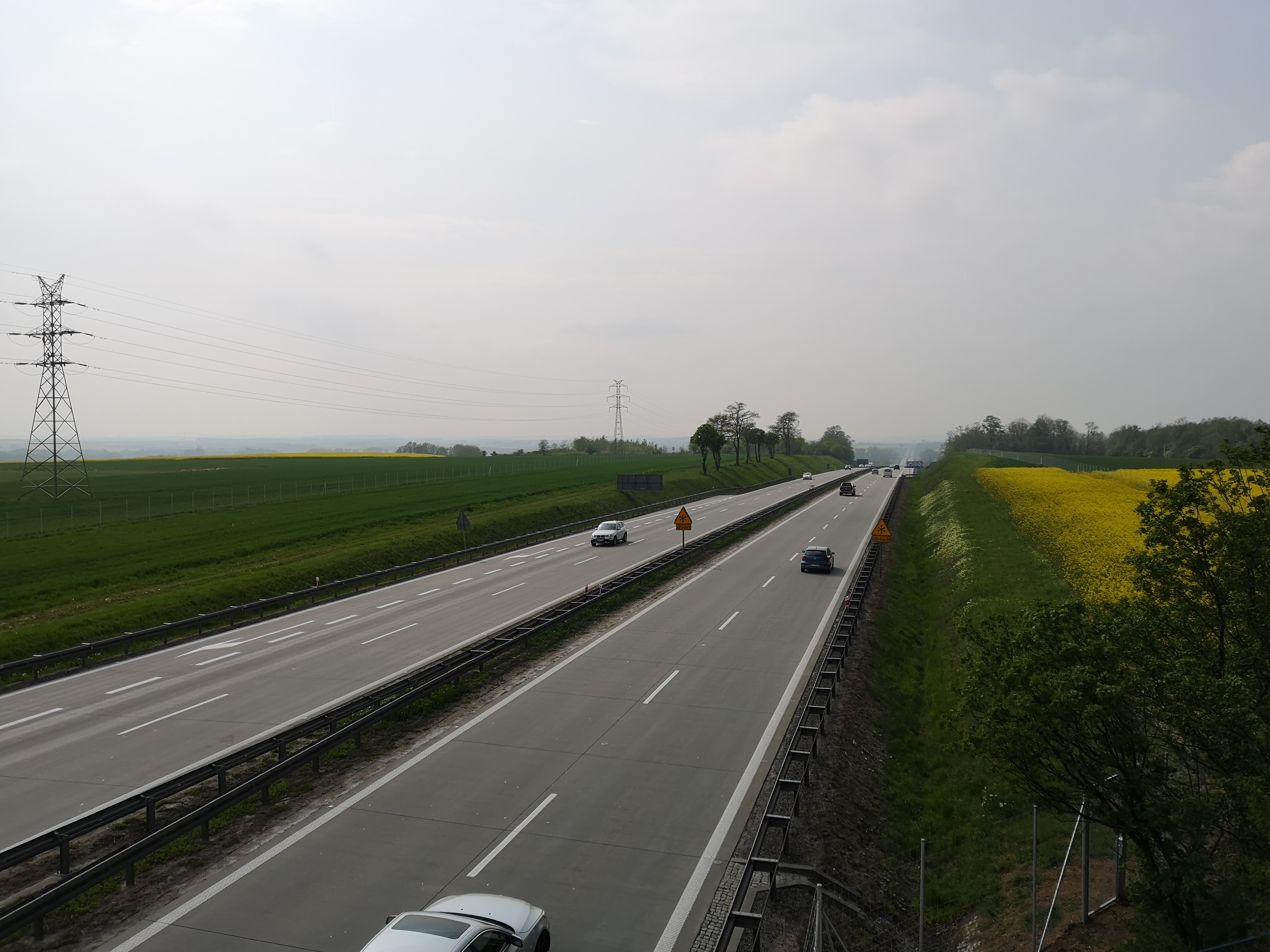
The substandard section of A4 west of Wrocław

Motorways and expressways constructed before 1999 do not have to fulfill technical parameters defined by the ministry ordinance. As of 2026, one notable case of a substandard highway remains:

- A4 on the section Krzyżowa – Wrocław (103 km) was constructed in years 1934 – 1937 (then the territory of Nazi Germany) and renovated in years 2002 – 2006. The road received new high quality surface but the geometry was kept unchanged and many overpasses above the motorway were kept. In effect, this part has no emergency lanes and the speed limit is decreased to 110 km/h. Its full reconstruction (and widening to three lanes per direction) is scheduled for years 2027 – 2031.
Notable historical cases:
- Expressways were formerly allowed to admit at-grade intersections with minor public roads in exceptional cases. The last such section which remained operational past 1999 was S3 near Szczecin (19 km), opened in 1979, which featured two at-grade road intersections until the reconstruction conducted in years 2019 – 2020. Since 2020, all expressways (as well as motorways) in Poland only have grade-separated interchanges and the exception admitting at-grade intersections on expressways was formally removed from the ordinance in 2022.
- A6 near Szczecin (29 km) was constructed by Nazi Germany and kept using the original surface made of concrete slabs until the reconstruction conducted in years 1996 – 1999 and (easternmost fragment) 2017 – 2021.
- A18 (70 km) had its southern carriageway constructed by Nazi Germany. The northern carriageway was constructed in 2004 – 2006, while the southern carriageway kept using the original concrete slabs until the reconstruction conducted in years 2020 – 2023.

== Speed limits ==
Maximum speed (km/h) by vehicle type	Motorway	Expressway	
Maximum speed (km/h) by vehicle type	Motorway	dual-carriageway	single-carriageway
Private car, motorbike, van up to 3.5 t (except if towing trailer)	140	120	100
Bus meeting additional technical requirements	100		
Bus or a vehicle over 3.5 t or towing trailer or carrying dangerous materials	80		
Vehicle having equipment more than 1.5 m forward of the driver's seat	60		
Motorbike (including towing trailer) carrying a child up to 7 years old	40		

=== Other restrictions ===
- Pedestrians, bicycles, mopeds, and agricultural vehicles are not allowed on motorways.
- It is forbidden to stop except in extraordinary circumstances, or to travel backwards.
- Towing is not allowed on motorways, but is permitted on expressways.

== Tolls ==
Motorways with tolled sections

E-toll sign for vehicles over 3.5 t

Since 2023, all state-owned highways are free for vehicles up to 3.5 tons of permissible maximum weight (for a passenger car with a trailer, the joint permissible maximum weight of the car and the trailer must not exceed 3.5 tons). On some sections, old inactive infrastructure for toll collection is still in place.

The privately owned sections of A1, A2 and A4 are tolled. They are indicated by the motorway sign accompanied by the word Płatna.

Tolled sections
Sign	Section	Manager	Length	Price (Note: For a private car up to 3.5 tons, for the whole distance)	Manual toll collection	Electronic toll collection	Notes
A1	Gdańsk – Toruń	GTC	152 km	30 PLN (€7)	Closed system: toll stations are located on every interchange; the driver receives a ticket upon entering the motorway and pays on the exit, with the price dependent on the distance driven.	Electronic toll collection through the Autopay mobile app allows one to choose the "fast gates" instead of waiting in the queue to the regular gates.	The gates are occasionally opened during the peaks of tourist traffic if the waiting time for the gates would have otherwise exceeded 25 minutes. In such circumstances no payment is collected neither by the manual nor the electronic system.
A2	Rzepin – Poznań-West	AWSA	133 km	50 PLN (€11)	Closed system: toll stations are located on every interchange; the driver receives a ticket upon entering the motorway and pays on the exit, with the price dependent on the distance driven.	Planned	Poznań bypass, including the common sections with S5 and S11, is free.
A2	Poznań-East – Sługocin	AWSA	85 km	64 PLN (€14)	Open system: two toll stations are located at the ends of the section; a person driving the whole distance pays at both gates, while a person entering or leaving the motorway mid-section pays only at one gate.	Electronic toll collection through the Autopay mobile app allows one to choose the "fast gates" instead of waiting in the queue to the regular gates.	Poznań bypass, including the common sections with S5 and S11, is free.
A4	Mysłowice – Kraków-Balice	STX	52 km	32 PLN (€6)	Open system: two toll stations are located at the ends of the section; a person driving the whole distance pays at both gates, while a person entering or leaving the motorway mid-section pays only at one gate.	Electronic toll collection through the Autopay mobile app allows one to choose the "fast gates" instead of waiting in the queue to the regular gates.	Will become free for vehicles up to 3.5 tons on 16 March 2027; Kraków bypass, including the common sections with S7 and S52, is free.

=== Vehicles over 3.5 tons and buses ===
Using e-Toll is obligatory for buses as well as all vehicles with maximum permissible weight exceeding 3.5 tons (including the trailer) while driving on the Polish roads (not just the highways). More details can be found on the e-Toll website.

== Traffic volumes ==
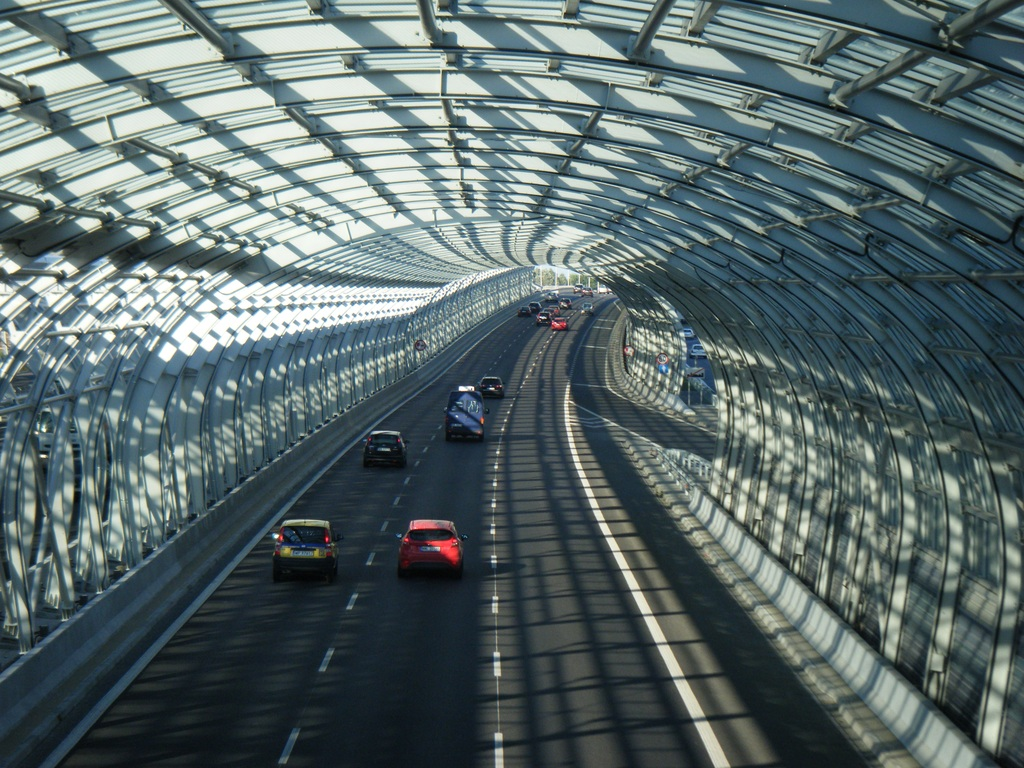
S8 in Warsaw

Traffic volumes in Poland note rapid increase since the fall of communism in 1989: the annual average daily traffic recorded on the national roads network in 2025 is 14'880 vehicles per day, which amounts to 395% of the average traffic recorded in 1990. With the increasing traffic, the length of overburdened single-carriageway national roads had also been steadily increasing until reaching the maximum of 1389 km in 2010. Due to the large number of highway sections opened after 2010, the length of overburdened roads has started falling down for the first time in history, from 1389 km in 2010 to 838 km in 2025.

The latest general measurement was conducted in 2025. (Note: Additional measurements were conducted in 2026 on major road sections opened in 2025 and adjacent roads with traffic volumes affected by the 2025 openings) The following highways recorded the highest volumes:

Busiest highways in Poland
No	Section	AADT	Notes
1	S8 in Warsaw	196,000	3 or more lanes per direction. Partially joint with S7.
2	S2 Warsaw southern bypass	161,000	3 or more lanes per direction. Partially joint with S7 and S8.
3	A2 west of Warsaw	111,000	3 lanes per direction. Widening to 4 lanes is planned to start in 2026.

The highest and lowest recorded volumes per cross-section and road category were:

Category	Section	AADT	Notes
Busiest highways by road profile
Busiest highway with 2x5 or more lanes	S8 in Warsaw	196,000	Joint section of S7 and S8.
Busiest highway with 2x4 lanes	S8 in Warsaw	165,000	The section had 2x3 lanes at the time of the measurement, the hard shoulders were repurposed as the 4-th lanes in 2026. Joint section of S7 and S8.
Busiest highway with 2x3 lanes	S2 Warsaw southern bypass	127,000	Joint section of S2, S7 and S8.
Busiest highway with 2x2 lanes	A4 Kraków western bypass	94,000	Some decrease in traffic on A4 is expected after Kraków eastern bypass (S7) is completed in late 2026. Widening to 3 lanes per direction is planned in the future (after 2030).
Busiest highway with 2+1 lanes	S19 north of Rzeszów	24,000	Second carriageway is under construction.
Busiest highway with 1+1 lanes	S1 Żywiec bypass	20,000	
Busiest regular roads Note: Measurements are performed on national and voivodeship roads except within the borders of major cities
Busiest dual-carriageway national road	DK7 north of Warsaw	62,000	2 lanes per direction with at-grade intersections and traffic lights. New parallel route of S7 is planned to be opened in the future (around 2032).
Busiest single-carriageway national road	DK44 west of Kraków	33,000	Widening to 2 lanes per direction is planned in the future (after 2030).
Busiest single-carriageway voivodeship road	DW946 between S1 and Żywiec	31,000	
Busiest single-carriageway road within the planned highway network	DK74 west of Kielce	29,000	S74 is under construction, expected to be opened in 2028.
Least busy highways
Least busy single-carriageway highway	S22 near (Poland) /Kaliningrad Oblast	1,300	Restrictions in crossing the border apply since the Russian invasion of Ukraine.
Least busy dual-carriageway highway	S19 near (Poland) / (Belarus)	1,600	Restrictions in crossing the border apply since the Russian invasion of Ukraine.
Least busy highway except near-border sections	S11 Olesno bypass	3,500	The utilisation of the bypass is expected to increase after the remaining stretches of S11 are completed around 2031.

== History ==
=== Before World War II ===
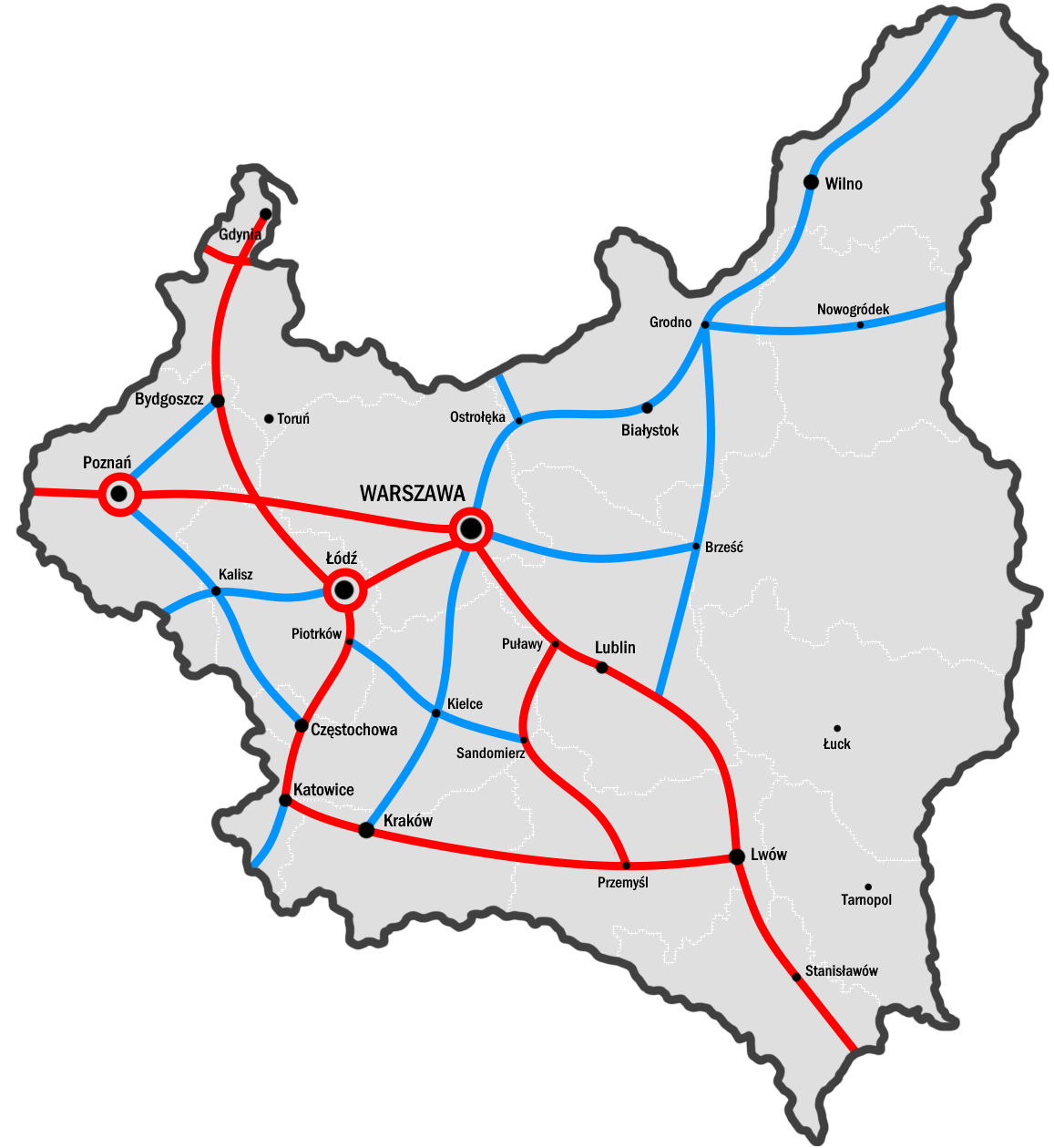
The network planned prior to WWII

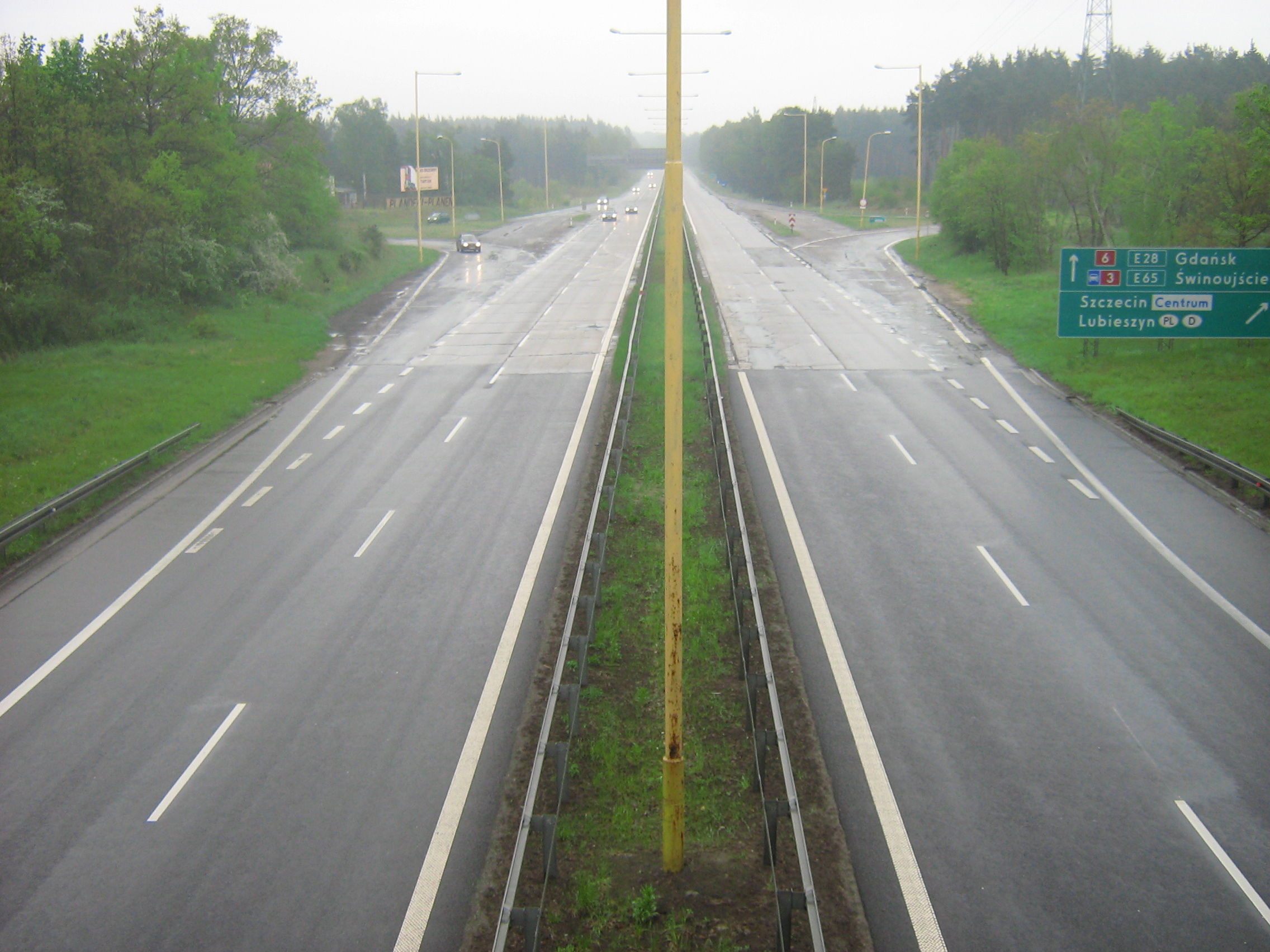
Pre-WWII surface on A6 before the reconstruction (photo from 2009)

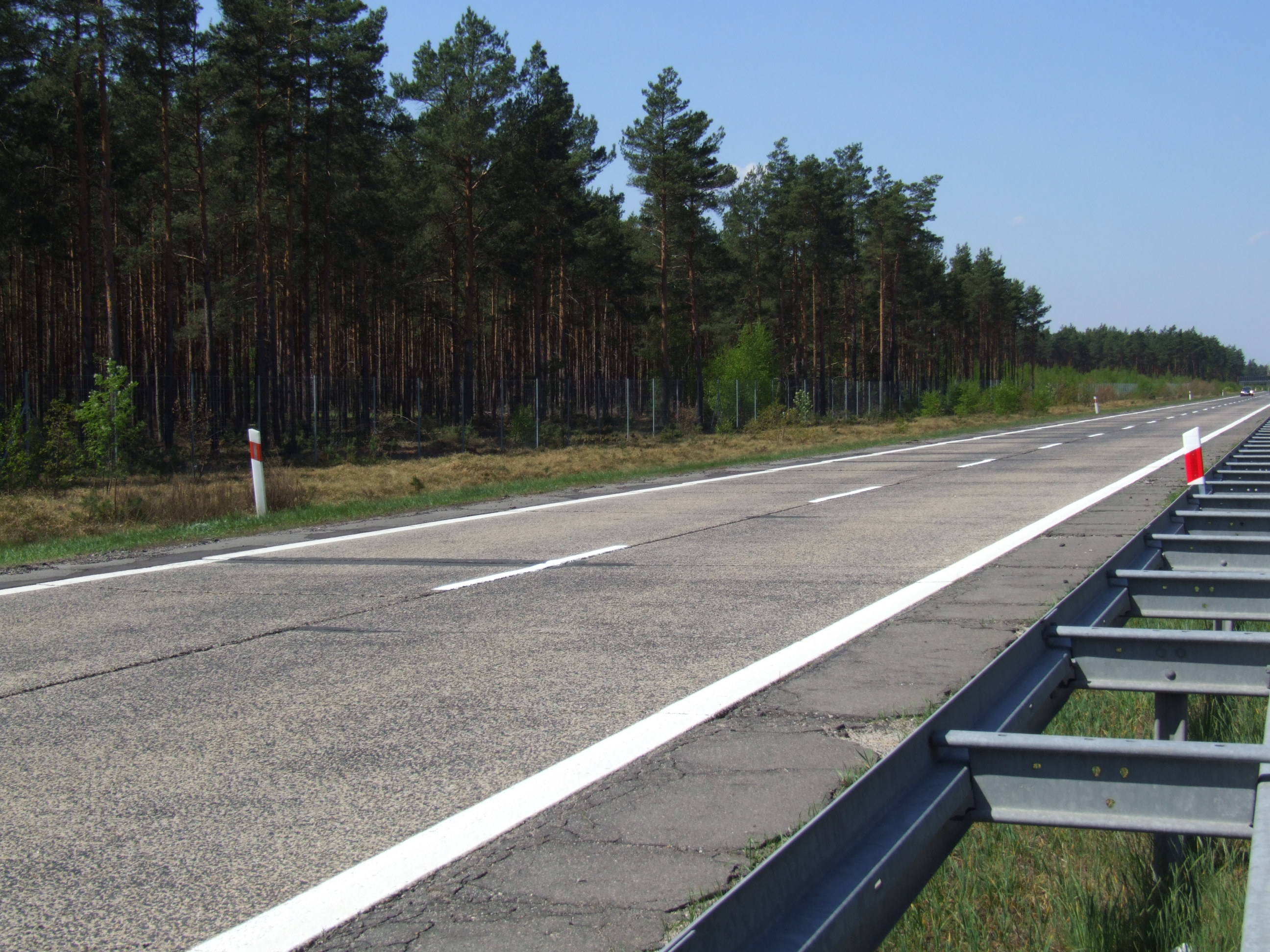
Pre-WWII surface on the southern carriageway of A18 before the reconstruction (photo from 2012)

The first plans of creation of a national highway network in Poland were conceived in the interwar period:

Plans

The main promoter of this concept was Professor Melchior Wladyslaw Nestorowicz of the Warsaw University of Technology, who organized three Road Congresses, during which a group of specialists discussed the creation of the network. On 5 March 1939, in the trade magazine Drogowiec, Professor Nestorowicz proposed a very ambitious plan for the construction of almost 5,000 kilometres of category I and II roads, based on similar programmes in Germany and Italy. Nestorowicz sketched a map of the future system with the following routes:

First class roads would, according to the plans, consist of the following motorways (totalling some 2,500 km (1,553.4 mi):

- Warsaw - Łódź - 100 km
- Warsaw – Poznań - Polish-German border - 350 km
- Warsaw beltway - 130 km
- Poznań beltway - 80 km
- Gdynia – Bydgoszcz – Łódź – 500 km
- Łódź beltway - 90 km
- Bytow - Free City of Danzig border - 50 km
- Katowice – Kraków – Lwów - 375 km
- Warsaw – Lublin - Lwów – Sniatyn - Polish-Romanian border - 550 km
- Puławy – Sandomierz – Przemyśl - 175 km

Second class roads would consist of the following motorways, totalling another 2,295 km (1,430 mi):

- Piotrków Trybunalski - Kielce - Sandomierz - 180 km
- Warsaw – Kielce – Kraków - 180 km
- Łódź - Kalisz - Polish-German border north of Wrocław - 130 km
- Warsaw – Grodno – Vilnius – Polish - Lithuania - Latvian border near Daugavpils - 575 km
- Grodno - Nowogrodek - Polish-Soviet border near Minsk - 190 km
- Bydgoszcz – Poznań – Częstochowa - 350 km
- Katowice – Cieszyn – Polish-Czechoslovak border - 60 km
- Ostrołęka - Polish-East Prussian border - 50 km
- Grodno - Polish-Lithuanian border - 40 km
- Grodno - Brzesc nad Bugiem - Krasnystaw - 300 km
- Warsaw – Brzesc nad Bugiem - 170 km

In 1934, Nazi Germany started the construction of their motorway system, parts of which today form A18 and A4 to Wrocław (Breslau), as well as A6 (Szczecin bypass) and S22 (parts of the planned motorway to Königsberg). About half of them were constructed as single-carriageway with the intention of adding a second carriageway in later years. However, after 1938, warfare expenses meant little money would be invested into any infrastructure and only one 9 km single-carriageway piece west of Gliwice (now A4) was constructed.

Highway sections constructed by Nazi Germany
Signage	Section	Length	Start of construction	Opening	Notes
A4 autostrada (Poland)	Krzyżowa – Krzywa	12.3 km (7.6 mi)	1934	17 October 1937	
A4 autostrada (Poland)	Krzywa – Wrocław	91 km (56.5 mi)	1934	27 September 1936	
A4 autostrada (Poland)	Wrocław – Brzeg (Owczary)	34.1 km (21.2 mi)	1934	1938	Southern carriageway only
A4 autostrada (Poland)	Ujazd (Nogowczyce) – Łany	9.1 km (5.7 mi)	1940	1942	Southern carriageway only
A4 autostrada (Poland)	Łany – Kleszczów (Gliwice)	8.8 km (5.5 mi)	1936	1938	Southern carriageway only
A6 autostrada (Poland)	– Szczecin-Zachód	2.6 km (1.6 mi)	1934	27 September 1936	
A6 autostrada (Poland)	Szczecin-Zachód – Rzęśnica	26.6 km (16.5 mi)	1934	1938	
A18 autostrada (Poland)	– Iłowa	37.2 km (23.1 mi)	1936	1938	Southern carriageway only
A18 autostrada (Poland)	Iłowa – Golnice	32 km (19.9 mi)	1935	17 October 1937	Southern carriageway only
A18 autostrada (Poland)	Golnice – Krzyżowa	5.9 km (3.7 mi)	1936	1938	
Expressway S22 (Poland)	Elbląg – Grzechotki	51.4 km (31.9 mi)	1934	1938	Western carriageway only
Total		316.9 km (196.9 mi) of which 178.5 km (110.9 mi) single carriageway	Note: Signage of the roads at the time of opening was different.		

In Poland, a 28 km stretch between Warlubie and Osiek (now DW214) was constructed in 1937 – 1939 in the motorway standard of the time (today not considered a highway) with a concrete surface, which was designed by Italian engineer Piero Puricelli. The motorway was planned to reach Gdynia, but the outbreak of the Second World War halted the plans.

=== 1945 – 1972 ===
The aforementioned fragments of the Third Reich motorways (about half of them with only the first carriageway constructed) became part of the territory of the communist Poland after the Potsdam conference in 1945. Most of the motorway bridges had been destroyed by the warfare, but only a few were repaired or rebuilt in the first post-war years. The bridge over Ina river was reconstructed in 1972, and those on S22 only between 1996 and 2003. Apart from the bridges, almost all the motorways were left in the same condition as they were in 1945 until the mid-1990s. The only road left from Nazi times that was completed by the People's Republic of Poland was a one-carriageway small section between Łęczyca and Lisowo (15 km of what is now DW142), which was built on the previous works of Nazis.

Plans

At the post-war year there were very ambitious plans to make a motorway network for the whole Poland. For example, engineer Eugeniusz Buszma has published his propositions to the network in the magazine "Drogowiec" (1946, issue 1):

1. East – West (Słubice – Warsaw – Białystok) – 680 km
2. North – South (Gdynia – Warsaw – Balkans) – 650 km
3. Silesia – Baltic I (Gdańsk – Łódź – Katowice) – 460 km
4. Pomeranian (Gdańsk – Szczecin) – 280 km
5. Silesian (Wrocław – Katowice – Kraków) – 190 km
6. Mazurian (Kaliningrad – Elbląg – Malbork) – 20 km
7. Silesia – Baltic II (Bydgoszcz – Wrocław) – 260 km
8. Łódź – Wrocław – (Prague) – 310 km
9. Katowice – (Vienna) – 60 km
10. Poznań – Szczecin – 200 km
11. Radom – Lublin – (Lviv) – 220 km

In total, the mileage, according to the proposal, would total more than 3,300 km (2,050 mi).

After the addition of the sections built by the Third Reich the total network length had to be approx. 3700 km. In 1963 the Motorization Council at the Council of Ministers had presented the similar plan plus the motorways: Warsaw-Kraków-Zakopane, Kraków-Przemyśl, Warsaw-Bydgoszcz-Koszalin, Poznań-Koszalin i Warsaw-Terespol (approx. 1250 km).

Despite announcing such pompous plans, no motorway was opened in the meantime.

=== In the 1970s ===
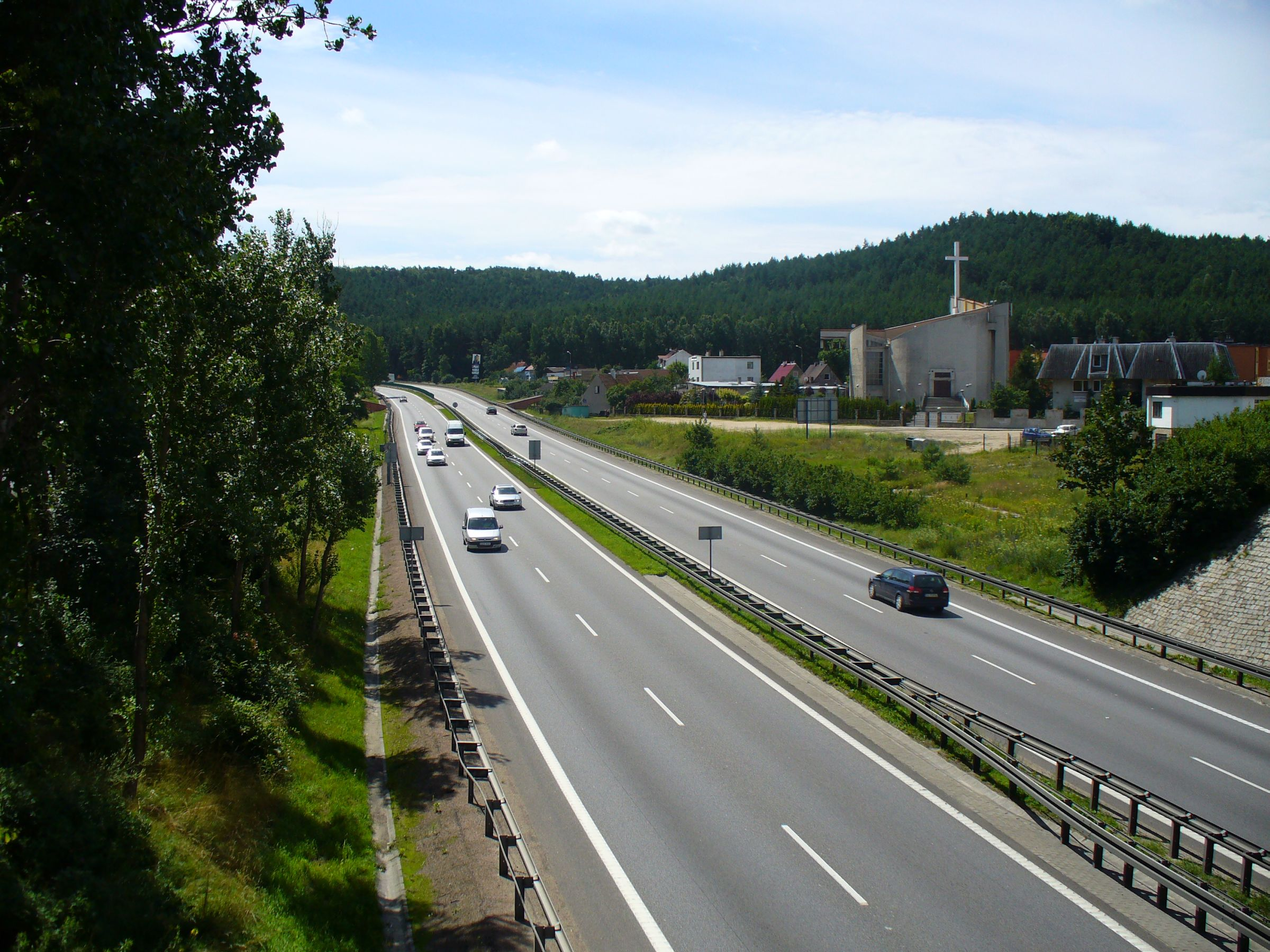
S6 in Gdynia, part of Tricity bypass: the oldest expressway in Poland (1st carriageway opened in 1977)

In the 1970s the construction of the first highways started.

Plans

In 1972 it was planned to build:

- the Gliwice-Kraków motorway (now A4)
- the second carriageway of the Wrocław-Gliwice motorway (also A4)
- the Warsaw-Katowice motorway (so-called "Gierkówka", now the S8/A1 road), in the near future

The plans were expanded in 1976 by the following sections:

- Tarnów – Kraków (now A4),
- eastern GOP (Górnośląski Okręg Przemysłowy) bypass (now S1, northern part),
- Bielsko-Biała – Cieszyn (now S52, southern part),
- Warszawa – Poznań (so-called Olimpijka, now A2),
- Łódź – Piotrków Trybunalski (now A1).

In 1973 – 1976, "Gierkówka" dual carriageway from Warsaw to Katowice (281 km (175 mi)) was built. Originally planned as a motorway, it was in the end constructed by adding another carriageway to the existing road, hence going through many villages and crossing with local roads. The part from Piotrków Trybunalski to Częstochowa (78 km) was constructed as a new route on a motorway alignment, but the crossings between the highway and other roads were constructed as one-level intersections with pedestrian crossings and no viaducts or overpasses.

Highway sections opened in the 1970s
Signage	Section	Length	Start of construction	Opening
National road 1 (Poland)	Piotrków Trybunalski – Częstochowa substandard (multiple at-grade intersections), constructed on motorway alignment, not signed as a highway	78 km (48 mi)	1973	1976
Expressway S6 (Poland)	Tri-city bypass (eastern carriageway) substandard (two at-grade intersections, then reconstructed when adding a second carriageway in the 1980s)	37.7 km (23.4 mi)	1973	1977
Expressway S6 (Poland)	Szczecin-Rzęśnica (end of post-German A6 motorway) – Goleniów substandard (two at-grade intersections)	19.3 km (12.0 mi)	1976	1979
Total		57 km (35.4 mi) of which 37.7 km (23.4 mi) single carriageway		

=== In the 1980s ===
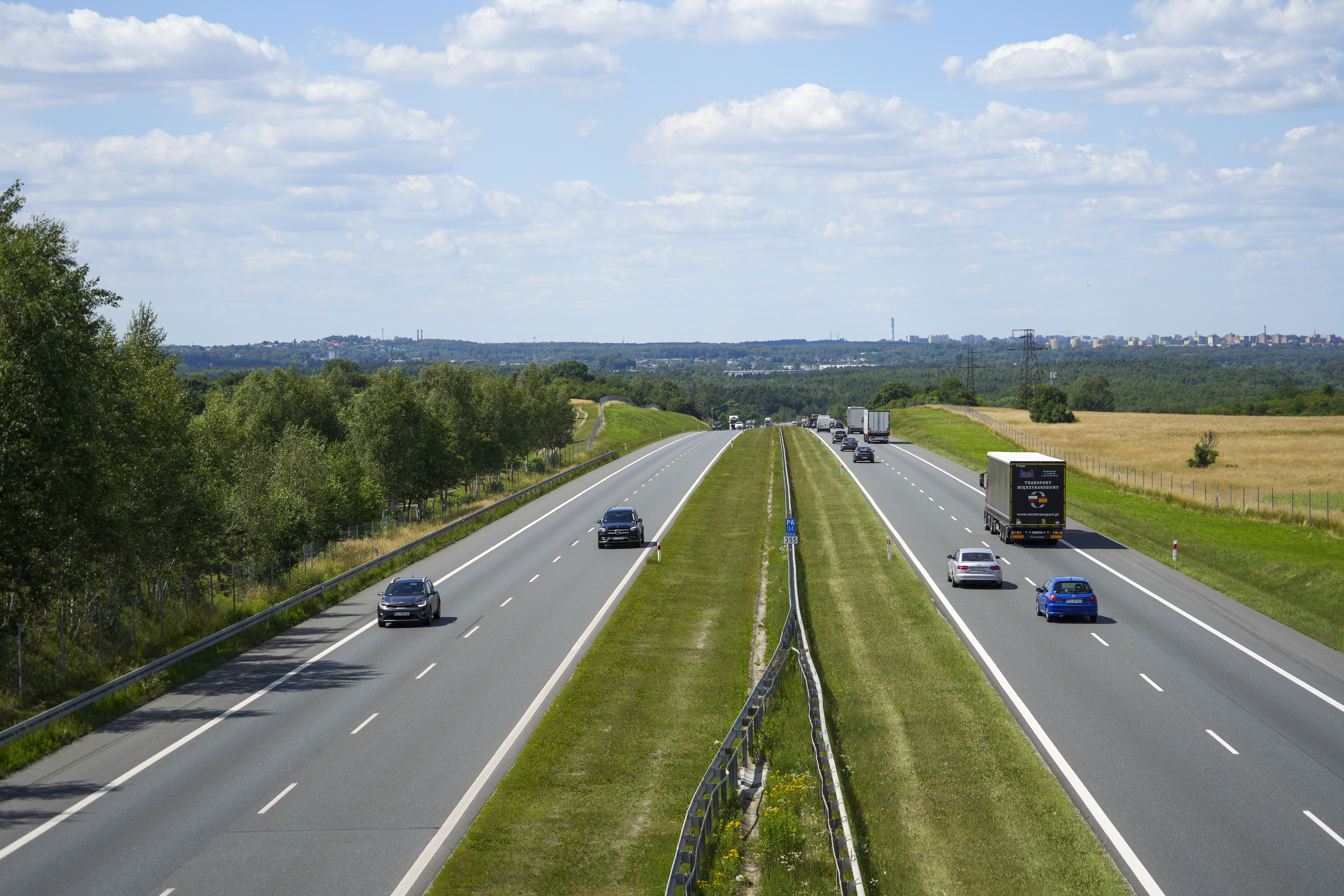
A4 near Jaworzno, opened in 1983

Near the end of the 1970s the first construction of motorways started and continued to the next decade. The roads opened in the 1980s were the first motorways and expressways meeting the contemporary highways standards (at least with respect to their more important attributes), although in multiple cases the poor quality of their construction forced major renovations to be performed as soon as within the first 20 years of operation.

The major routes planned as motorways were A1, A2 and A4, while other main routes were planned as expressways. The implementation of these plans, however, came at a very slow pace: throughout the 1980s, only an average of 21 km (13 mi) of highways in the whole country were being opened per year.

Highway sections opened in the 1980s average: 21 km / year
Signage	Section	Length	Start of construction	Opening	Notes
A1 autostrada (Poland)	Tuszyn - Piotrków Trybunalski	16.1 km (10.0 mi)	1978	18 December 1989	Reconstructed 2019 – 2021
A2 autostrada (Poland)	Września - Konin	35.7 km (22.2 mi) (to Sługocin)	1977	9 October 1985	Renovated 2002 – 2003
A2 autostrada (Poland)	Września - Konin	13.5 km (8.4 mi)	1986	10 November 1988	Renovated 2002 – 2003
A4 autostrada (Poland)	Jaworzno - Kraków (Tyniec)	29.6 km (18.4 mi) (Chrzanów - Kraków / Balice I)	1976	3 January 1983	Renovated 1999 – 2000
A4 autostrada (Poland)	Jaworzno - Kraków (Tyniec)	6.1 km (3.8 mi) (Jaworzno - Chrzanów)	1978	22 November 1986	Renovated 1999 – 2000
A4 autostrada (Poland)	Jaworzno - Kraków (Tyniec)	7.8 km (4.8 mi) (1st section of Kraków bypass: Balice I - Tyniec)	1979	8 December 1988	
Expressway S1 (Poland)	Dąbrowa Górnicza - Tychy	34.7 km (21.6 mi)	1978	1983	
Expressway S6 (Poland)	Tri-city bypass (to Straszyn)	32.4 km (20.1 mi)	1978	1984	Second carriageway
Expressway S7 (Poland)	Kielce bypass	22.9 km (14.2 mi)	1974	1984	First carriageway
Expressway S52 (Poland)	Kraków northern bypass: fragment Balice - Zabierzów	3.5 km (2.2 mi)		1986	Then signed as motorway A4a
Expressway S86 (Poland)	Katowice - Sosnowiec	6.8 km (4.2 mi)	1978	1985	First completely done expressway
Total		209.1 km (129.9 mi) of which 55.3 km (34.4 mi) single carriageway, 32.4 km (20.1 mi) second carriageway			

=== In the 1990s ===
The highway network in 1990

In the III Republic of Poland, planned S3 was promoted to motorway A3 (the decision was later reversed) and a plan was introduced (also later reversed) of constructing motorway A8 Łódź – Wrocław – Bolków (now S8/A8/S5). Szczecin bypass (A6) and section Olszyna – Krzywa (then named A12, now A4/A18) were promoted to motorways, even though at that time the majority of their lengths was in bad shape, laid with the original concrete surface from the 1930s with no significant works having been performed on any of them throughout the whole communist period.

Highway sections opened in the 1990s average: 15 km / year
Signage	Section	Length	Start of construction	Opening	Notes
A4 autostrada (Poland)	Katowice - Jaworzno	15.9 km (9.9 mi) (Mysłowice - Jaworzno)	1986	4 September 1991	Northern carriageway was opened on 29 November 1990
A4 autostrada (Poland)	Katowice - Jaworzno	11.1 km (6.9 mi) (Katowice - Mysłowice)	1989	30 October 1996	
A4 autostrada (Poland)	Katowice - Jaworzno	1.9 km (1.2 mi) (in Katowice)	?	10 November 1999	
A4 autostrada (Poland)	Kraków bypass (section Tyniec - ul.Kąpielowa)	3.5 km (2.2 mi) (to Skawina)	1988	1993	
A4 autostrada (Poland)	Kraków bypass (section Tyniec - ul.Kąpielowa)	5.4 km (3.4 mi)	1993	27 October 1995	A4 had a crossroad with ul. Kąpielowa till 2002, when the bridge was built over it.
A4 autostrada (Poland)	Zgorzelec	1.8 km (1.1 mi)	1992	15 July 1994	
A4 autostrada (Poland)	Krzyżowa - Krzywa	10.2 km (6.3 mi)	?	1995	Renovated
A6 autostrada (Poland)	Podjuchy	12.7 km (7.9 mi)	1996	1999	Renovated
A18 autostrada (Poland)	Olszyna - Królów	9.6 km (6.0 mi)	?	1993	Northern carriageway added and border bridges renovated
A18 autostrada (Poland)	Golnice - Krzyżowa	5.9 km (3.7 mi)	?	1995	Renovated both carriageways
Expressway S3 (Poland)	Sulechów - Zielona Góra	26.8 km (16.7 mi)	1985	1995	Western carriageway only
Expressway S5 (Poland)	Świecie bypass	13 km (8.1 mi)	1994	1998	Single carriageway; dual carriageway near the interchanges
Expressway S7 (Poland)	Nowy Dwór Mazowiecki bypass	14.6 km (9.1 mi)	1990	1999	
Expressway S7 (Poland)	Miłomłyn bypass	5.1 km (3.2 mi)	1995	1997	Eastern carriageway only
Expressway S8 (Poland)	Radzymin bypass	8.1 km (5.0 mi)	1996	1998	
Expressway S52 (Poland)	Cieszyn-East	5.2 km (3.2 mi)	1991	1995	Then signed S1
Total		151.8 km (94.3 mi) of which 28.8 km (17.9 mi) reconstructed, 48.4 km (30.1 mi) single carriageway			

=== In the 2000s ===
The highway network in 2000

As of the beginning of 2000, the vast majority of national and international traffic routes were served by regular national roads with at-grade intersections and pedestrian crossings, most of them leading through the centres of cities, towns and villages, and most of them single carriageway. Only the following number of highways was present:

- about 275 km (171 mi) of modern dual-carriageway motorways and expressways (3.5% of the network as planned nowadays),
- about 275 km (171 mi) of not-resurfaced Nazi German motorways from the 1930s, over half of which with only the first carriageway constructed,
- about 90 km (56 mi) of single-carriageway expressways.

==== Before the EU membership ====
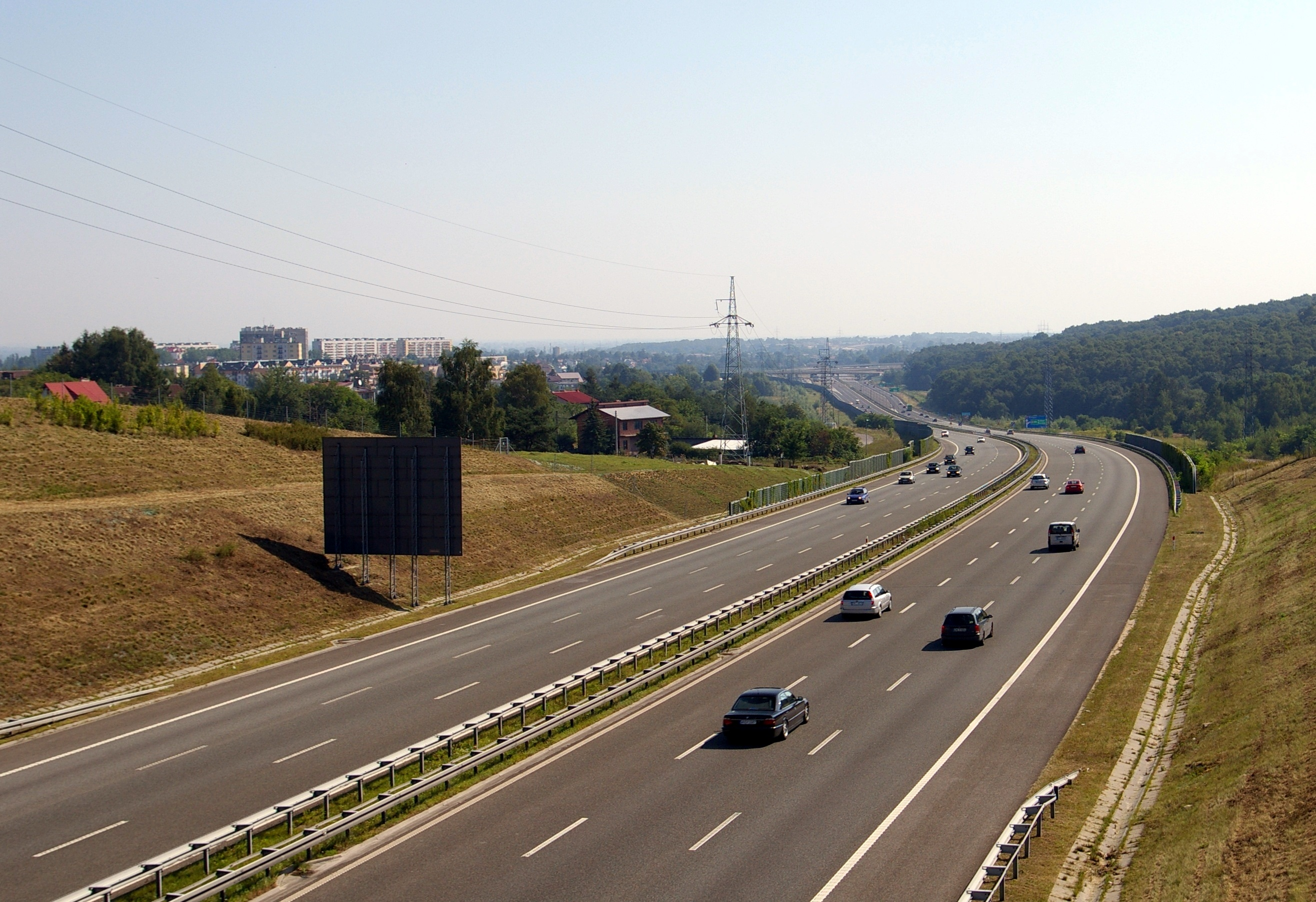
A4, Kraków southern bypass, opened in 2003

At the beginning of the 21st century, the tempo of highway construction started to increase. The main focus was on the west–east motorways A4 and A2. In 2002, a long-awaited renovation of the A4 from Krzywa to Wrocław (93 km) has started, which included laying new high quality surface in place of the Nazi German concrete slabs, reconstruction of all the pre-WWII bridges on the motorway and renovation of the viaducts above the motorway.

This is also the period when Poland started introducing motorway tolls, first in 2000 for the A4 section between Mysłowice and Kraków.

Highway sections opened in 2000 – 2003 average: 57 km / year
Signage	Section	Length	Start of construction	Opening	Notes
A2 autostrada (Poland)	Poznań Komorniki - Września	11.2 km (7.0 mi) (to Poznań Krzesiny)	1998	13 September 2003	
A2 autostrada (Poland)	Poznań Komorniki - Września	37.3 km (23.2 mi)	2002	27 November 2003	
A4 autostrada (Poland)	Wrocław (Bielany) - Gliwice-West (Kleszczów)	34.1 km (21.2 mi) (to Brzeg)	1997	16 December 2000	Southern carriageway reconstructed, northern carriageway constructed
A4 autostrada (Poland)	Wrocław (Bielany) - Gliwice-West (Kleszczów)	56.6 km (35.2 mi) (to Opole-East)	1997	16 December 2000	
A4 autostrada (Poland)	Wrocław (Bielany) - Gliwice-West (Kleszczów)	34.3 km (21.3 mi) (to Nogowczyce)	1997	26 July 2001	
A4 autostrada (Poland)	Wrocław (Bielany) - Gliwice-West (Kleszczów)	17.9 km (11.1 mi) (to Kleszczów)	2001	4 December 2003	Southern carriageway reconstructed, northern carriageway constructed
A4 autostrada (Poland)	Chorzów - Katowice Mikołowska	4.4 km (2.7 mi)	1998	2001	
A4 autostrada (Poland)	Kraków bypass (section ul.Kąpielowa - Wieliczka)	7 km (4.3 mi)	2000	3 September 2003	
Expressway S5 (Poland)	Śmigiel bypass	4.1 km (2.5 mi)	?	2002	First carriageway
Expressway S6 (Poland)	Straszyn - Rusocin	5.4 km (3.4 mi)	2000	2001	Second carriageway
Expressway S7 (Poland)	Białobrzegi bypass	7.7 km (4.8 mi)	2001	2003	
Expressway S8 (Poland)	Ostrów Mazowiecka bypass	7.6 km (4.7 mi)	2000	2003	
Total		227.6 km (141.4 mi) of which 9.5 km (5.9 mi) single carriageway			

==== In European Union ====
The highway network in 2010

1 May 2004 was a crucial day for the history of motorway construction and that is when the length of highway constructions started to increase the most. One of the major advantages of signing the European Union access document was that Poland could get access to large funds for co-financing the construction of new roads and upgrades of the existing road infrastructure. Overall, the co-financing funds amounted to about 43% of the road construction costs during the first 20 years of the EU membership.

At this time, the existing scattered pieces of highways began to converge into the basis of the future network:

- until 2004, Katowice and Kraków (linked by A4) were the only pair of Poland's largest cities connected by a highway;
- in 2005, A4 connected Wrocław with Katowice and Kraków, while in 2009 – with Germany;
- in 2006, A2 connected Poznań with Łódź.

A large number of expressway bypasses of towns were also constructed at this time. On many of them, only one carriageway was built, with the allocated space prepared for easy construction of the second carriageway later.

Highway sections opened in 2004 – 2010 average: 151 km / year
Signage	Section	Length	Start of construction	Opening	Notes
A1 autostrada (Poland)	Gdańsk (Rusocin) - Grudziądz	24.2 km (15.0 mi)	2005	2007	
A1 autostrada (Poland)	Gdańsk (Rusocin) - Grudziądz	64.7 km (40.2 mi)	2005	2008	
A1 autostrada (Poland)	Sośnica - Żory	15.6 km (9.7 mi)	22 January 2007	20 October 2009	
A1 autostrada (Poland)	Sośnica - Żory	7.5 km (4.7 mi)	2007	15 December 2010	
A2 autostrada (Poland)	Nowy Tomyśl - Poznań Komorniki	50.4 km (31.3 mi)	2002	October 2004	
A2 autostrada (Poland)	Konin - Łódź (Stryków)	103.7 km (64.4 mi)	2004	July 2006	
A4 autostrada (Poland)	Krzywa - Wrocław (Bielany)	93 km (57.8 mi)	2002	2004–2006 (in sections)	Renovated both carriageways
A4 autostrada (Poland)	Gliwice (Sośnica) - Chorzów Batory	15.7 km (9.8 mi)	2002	January 2005	
A4 autostrada (Poland)	Gliwice bypass (Kleszczów - Sośnica)	19.1 km (11.9 mi)	2003	October 2005	
A4 autostrada (Poland)	Zgorzelec - Krzyżowa	49.7 km (30.9 mi)	2006	August 2009	
A4 autostrada (Poland)	Wieliczka - Targowisko	19.5 km (12.1 mi)	2007	2009	
A6 autostrada (Poland)	Szczecin Klucz - Szczecin Kijewo	7.7 km (4.8 mi)	2005	2007	Renovated both carriageways
A18 autostrada (Poland)	Olszyna - Golnice	71.5 km (44.4 mi)	2004	2006	Constructed the northern carriageway alongside the pre-WWII southern carriageway
Expressway S1 (Poland)	Zwardoń - Milówka	12.0 km (7.5 mi)	2002 - 2007	2004 - 2010 (in sections)	Single carriageway; then signed S69
Expressway S1 (Poland)	Żywiec - Przybędza	7.7 km (4.8 mi)	2005	2007	Single carriageway; then signed S69
Expressway S1 (Poland)	Pyrzowice airport - Podwarpie	12.0 km (7.5 mi)	2005	2006	Single carriageway
Expressway S3 (Poland)	Szczecin – Gorzów Wielkopolski	81.6 km (50.7 mi)	2008	2010	
Expressway S3 (Poland)	Gorzów Wielkopolski bypass	11.9 km (7.4 mi)	2003	2007	Single carriageway
Expressway S3 (Poland)	Międzyrzecz bypass	6.3 km (3.9 mi)	2004	2006	Single carriageway
Expressway S3 (Poland)	Nowa Sól bypass	18 km (11.2 mi)	2006	2008	Single carriageway
Expressway S5 (Poland)	Szubin bypass	4.5 km (2.8 mi)	2004	2006	Single carriageway
Expressway S6 (Poland)	Słupsk bypass	16.3 km (10.1 mi)	2008	2010	Single carriageway; dual carriageway near the interchanges
Expressway S7 (Poland)	Jędrzejów bypass	5.8 km (3.6 mi)	2003	2005	Partially (2.7 km) single carriageway
Expressway S7 (Poland)	Nowy Dwór Gdański bypass	2.5 km (1.6 mi)	2005	2007	
Expressway S7 (Poland)	Elbląg bypass	4.2 km (2.6 mi)	2005	2007	
Expressway S7 (Poland)	Grójec bypass	8.3 km (5.2 mi)	18 October 2006	19 September 2008	
Expressway S7 (Poland)	Białobrzegi - Jedlińsk	15.7 km (9.8 mi)	6 July 2006	30 June 2008	
Expressway S7 (Poland)	Myślenice - Lubień	16.2 km (10.1 mi)	2004	2009	
Expressway S7 (Poland)	Kielce bypass (northern part)	7.1 km (4.4 mi)	2007	2009	
Expressway S7 (Poland)	Płońsk bypass	4.7 km (2.9 mi)	28 September 2007	3 June 2009	
Expressway S7 (Poland)	Skurów – Białobrzegi	17.8 km (11.1 mi)	2007	2010	
Expressway S7 (Poland)	Kraków eastern bypass (first fragment)	2.8 km (1.7 mi)	2007	2010	
Expressway S8 (Poland)	Oleśnica bypass	7.2 km (4.5 mi)	2004	2006	
Expressway S8 (Poland)	Wyszków bypass	12.8 km (8.0 mi)	27 February 2006	14 November 2008	
Expressway S8 (Poland)	Wyszków - Radzymin	17.3 km (10.7 mi)	8 December 2006	31 July 2009	
Expressway S8 (Poland)	Wrocław - Kobierzyce	7 km (4.3 mi)	2007	31 December 2010	
Expressway S10 (Poland)	Toruń bypass (fragment)	12.4 km (7.7 mi)	2004	2005	Single carriageway
Expressway S10 (Poland)	Kobylanka bypass	13.8 km (8.6 mi)	2005	2007	Partially (7 km) single carriageway
Expressway S10 (Poland)	Stargard bypass	13.5 km (8.4 mi)	2008	2009	
Expressway S10 (Poland)	Bydgoszcz bypass (fragment)	10.4 km (6.5 mi)	2008	2009	
Expressway S10 (Poland)	Wyrzysk bypass	7.8 km (4.8 mi)	2008	2009	Single carriageway
Expressway S11 (Poland)	Poznań - Kórnik	14.1 km (8.8 mi)	2006	2009	
Expressway S11 (Poland)	Ostrów Wlkp. bypass (northern part)	6.1 km (3.8 mi)	2008	2009	Single carriageway
Expressway S12 (Poland)	Piaski bypass	4 km (2.5 mi)	2002	2004	
Expressway S12 (Poland)	Puławy bypass	12.7 km (7.9 mi)	2005	2007	Partially (8.7 km) single carriageway
Expressway S16 (Poland)	Barczewo – Biskupiec	20.1 km (12.5 mi)	2008	2010	Single carriageway
Expressway S17 (Poland)	Garwolin bypass	12.8 km (8.0 mi)	2005	2007	
Expressway S19 (Poland)	Międzyrzec Podlaski bypass	6.3 km (3.9 mi)	2005	2008	Single carriageway
Expressway S22 (Poland)	Elbląg - Grzechotki / Kaliningrad Oblast	51.6 km (32.1 mi)	April 2006	December 2008	Single carriageway; constructed in place of a partially destroyed motorway from the 1930s
Expressway S52 (Poland)	Cieszyn - Bielsko-Biała (Komorowice)	28 km (17.4 mi)	2002 - 2005	2005 - 2007 (in sections)	Then signed S1
Total		1,055.6 km (655.9 mi) of which 276.6 km (171.9 mi) single carriageway, 100.7 km (62.6 mi) reconstructed			

=== 2011 – 2015 ===
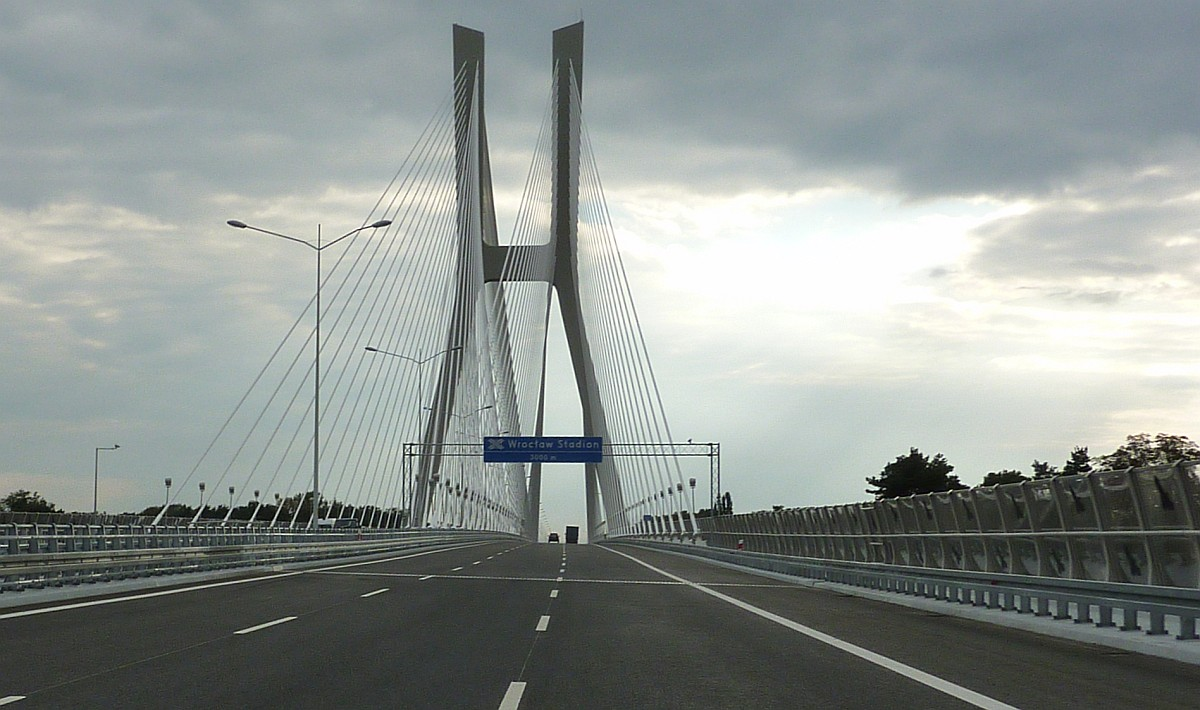
Rędziński bridge on A8, Wrocław bypass, opened in 2011

In the five years from 2011 to 2015, 1563 kilometers of motorways and expressways were opened – about as much as in the whole prior history of highway construction combined. The main focus was on developing connections between Poland's largest cities, especially those serving as host venues of UEFA Euro 2012, as well as on extending A4 towards Ukraine.

Length of highways opened in 2011 – 2015
Year	Length	Notes
2011	313 km (194 mi)	
2012	639 km (397 mi)	Of which 195 km (121 mi) were opened before Euro 2012 championship
2013	298 km (185 mi)	
2014	279 km (173 mi)	
2015	34 km (21 mi)	
Total	1,563 km (971 mi)	Of which 26 km first carriageway, 23 km second carriageway

The sections opened in 2011 – 2015 belonged to the following highways:

Road	Length	Notes
A1 autostrada (Poland)	273 km	A1 on the section Gdańsk – Łódź was completed in 2014
A2 autostrada (Poland) Expressway S2 (Poland)	234 km	A2 on the section Germany – Warsaw was completed in 2012
Expressway S3 (Poland)	88 km	S3 on the section Szczecin – Zielona Góra was completed in 2013, except that its older single-carriageway parts remained so until 2017
A4 autostrada (Poland)	183 km	
Expressway S7 (Poland)	138 km	
A8 autostrada (Poland) Expressway S8 (Poland)	365 km	S8 on the section Wrocław – Łódź was completed in 2014
Other	282 km	Expressway S1 (Poland) Expressway S5 (Poland) Expressway S6 (Poland) Expressway S11 (Poland) Expressway S12 (Poland) Expressway S17 (Poland) Expressway S19 (Poland) Expressway S51 (Poland) Expressway S61 (Poland) Expressway S74 (Poland) Expressway S79 (Poland)

=== 2016 – 2020 ===
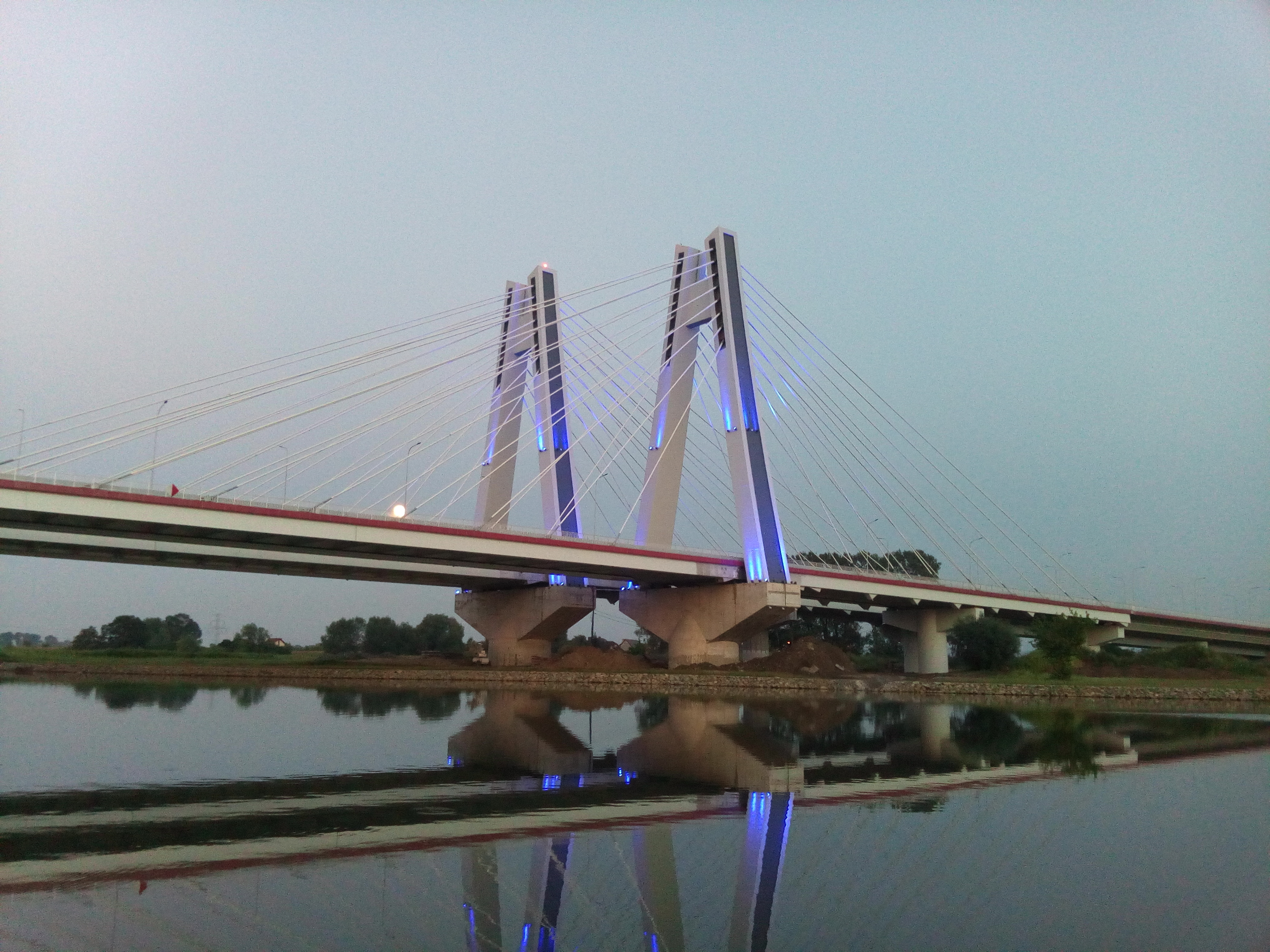
Bridge over Vistula on S7, Kraków eastern bypass, opened in 2017

The highway network in 2020

After the peak of investments before Euro 2012, very few new contracts for road construction were signed in 2012 and 2013. This resulted in a small number of sections being opened in 2015 and 2016, a large share of which were the last delayed fragments originally scheduled for a Euro 2012 opening. In particular:

- In 2016, the last delayed fragment of between Kraków and Ukraine was opened, making A4 the first major Polish highway completed on its whole length, as well as the first complete border-to-border highway connection.
- Also in 2016, the delayed bypass of Łódź was finished, making completed on its whole route except for those sections where national road 1 had already been a dual carriageway (see In the 1970s), allowing for a significantly lower priority of constructing the remaining stretch compared to other highways.

Since 2014, the number of signed contracts has risen again, resulting in the number of road openings having risen again since 2017.

Length of highways opened in 2016 – 2020
Year	Length	Notes
2016	123 km (76 mi)	
2017	295 km (183 mi)	
2018	318 km (198 mi)	
2019	410 km (255 mi)	
2020	135 km (84 mi)	
Total	1,281 km (796 mi)	Of which 13 km first carriageway, 81 km second carriageway

The sections opened in 2016 – 2020 belonged to the following highways:

Road	Length	Notes
Expressway S3 (Poland)	173 km	
Expressway S5 (Poland)	227 km	S5 on the section Poznań – Wrocław was completed in 2019
Expressway S6 (Poland)	128 km	S6 on the section Szczecin – Koszalin was completed in 2019
Expressway S7 (Poland)	213 km	
Expressway S8 (Poland)	128 km	S8 on its originally planned route from Wrocław to Białystok was completed in 2019; an extension to Kłodzko was later added to the plans
Expressway S17 (Poland)	97 km	S17 on the section Warsaw – Lublin was completed in 2020
Other	315 km	; A4 was completed in 2016

=== 2021 – 2025 ===
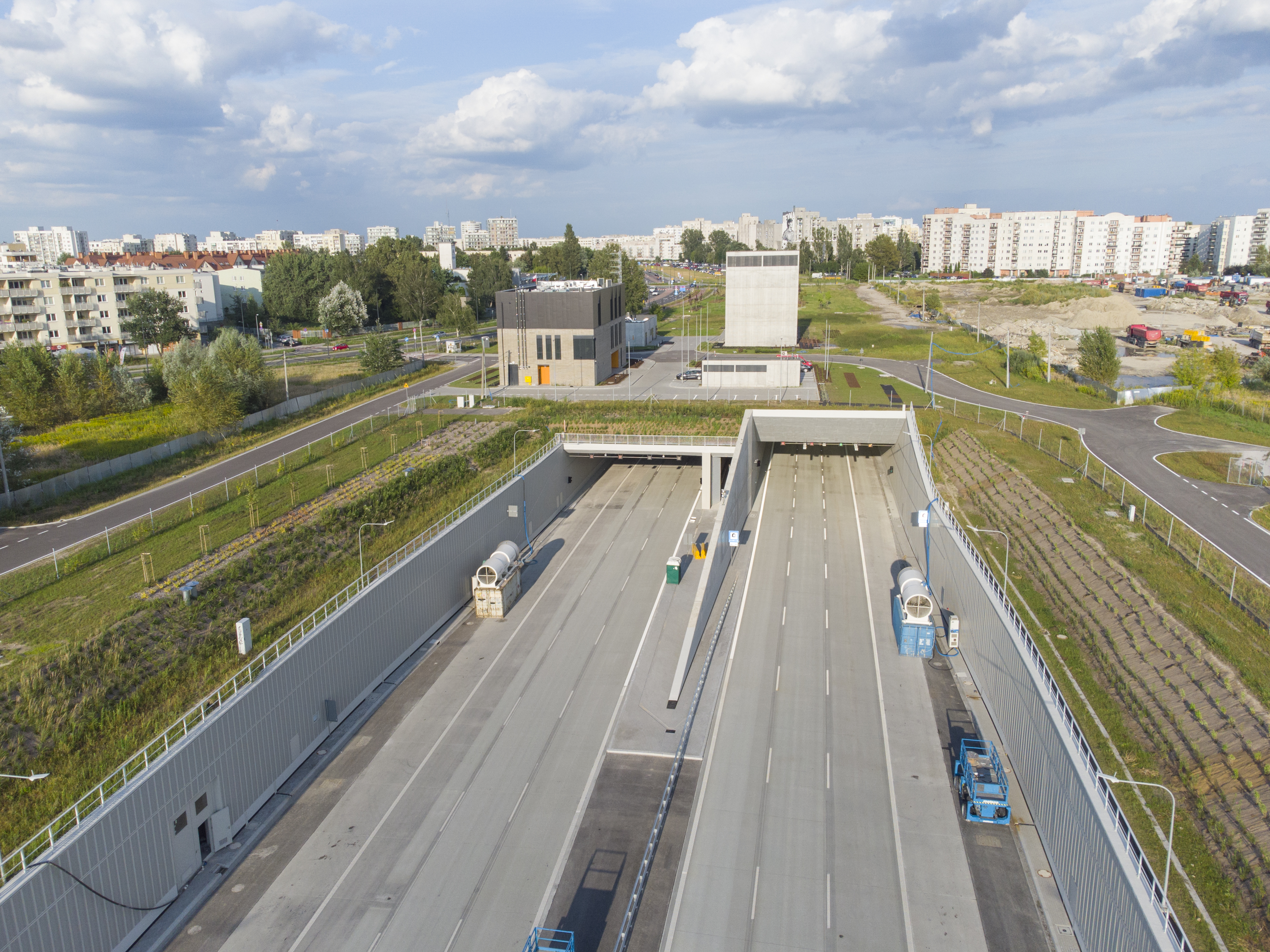
The tunnel section of S2 in Warsaw, opened in 2021

The highway network in 2025

The high tempo of highway development continued in the 2020s. The main focus was on construction of new highways in the less populated eastern Poland, including the international routes Via Carpatia and Via Baltica.

Length of highways opened in 2021 – 2025
Year	Length	Notes
2021	375 km (233 mi)	
2022	267 km (166 mi)	
2023	245 km (152 mi)	
2024	123 km (76 mi)	
2025	268 km (167 mi)	
Total	1,278 km (794 mi)	Of which 7 km first carriageway, 94 km second carriageway

The sections opened in 2021 – 2025 belonged to the following highways:

Road	Length	Notes
A1 autostrada (Poland)	81 km	A1 was completed in 2022
Expressway S3 (Poland)	104 km	S3 was completed in 2025
Expressway S6 (Poland)	108 km	
Expressway S7 (Poland)	222 km	S7 on the section Warsaw – Kraków was completed in 2024; a temporary detour through Kraków north-western bypass was in use until Kraków eastern bypass got completed in 2026
Expressway S11 (Poland)	80 km	
A18 autostrada (Poland)	70 km	Reconstruction of the pre-WWII southern carriageway of A18 was completed in 2023
Expressway S19 (Poland)	186 km	S19 "Via Carpathia" on the section Lublin – Rzeszów was completed in 2022, except that its older fragment with 2+1 lanes remains so until 2026
Expressway S61 (Poland)	183 km	S61 "Via Baltica" was completed in 2025
Other	249 km	S5 was completed in 2022 except its newly planned extensions to Ostróda and Bolków

=== 2026 – present ===
The highway network in 2026

Length of highways opened and planned to get opened in 2026 – 2030
Year	Length	Notes
2026	232 km (144 mi)	Opened sections and scheduled openings
2027 – 2030	940 km (584 mi)	Planned completion of ongoing contracts
Total	1,172 km (728 mi)	Of which 67 km second carriageway

The sections opened and planned to get opened in 2026 – 2030 belong to the following highways:

Road	Length	Notes
A2 autostrada (Poland)	83 km	A2 is scheduled to be completed in 2030
Expressway S6 (Poland)	88 km	S6/A6 was completed in 2026 on its original route from Germany to Gdańsk; Szczecin western bypass is under construction as an alternative route
Expressway S10 (Poland)	171 km	
Expressway S11 (Poland)	126 km	
Expressway S12 (Poland)	98 km	
Expressway S17 (Poland)	92 km	
Expressway S19 (Poland)	290 km	
Expressway S74 (Poland)	99 km	
Other	125 km	; S1 is scheduled to get completed in 2027

== Total length of highways by year ==
Year	Length of motorways and expressways (end of the year)
1936 (then Nazi Germany)	92 km
1937 (then Nazi Germany)	104 km and 38 km first carriageway
1938–1945 (then Nazi Germany)	133 km and 135 km first carriageway (further below not considered as a motorway until addition of the second carriageway)
1939–1945 (Poland)	28 km (today not considered as a highway)
1945–1976	133 km
1977	169 km
1978	169 km
1979	190 km
1980	190 km
1981	190 km
1982	190 km
1983	255 km
1984	278 km
1985	321 km
1986	327 km
1987	327 km
1988	348 km
1989	366 km
1990	381 km
1991	399 km
1992	399 km
1993	403 km
1994	405 km
1995	440 km
1996	453 km
1997	456 km
1998	490 km
1999	502 km
2000	592 km
2001	630 km
2002	639 km
2003	727 km
2004	781 km
2005	848 km
2006	1013 km
2007	1083 km
2008	1282 km
2009	1454 km
2010	1560 km
2011	1865 km
2012	2495 km
2013	2805 km
2014	3100 km
2015	3131 km
2016	3252 km
2017	3510 km
2018	3811 km
2019	4214 km
2020	4337 km
2021	4690 km
2022	4933 km
2023	5116 km
2024	5206 km
2025	5468 km
2026	5669 km (forecast)
2027	5850 km (forecast)
2028	6188 km (forecast)
2029	6502 km (forecast)
2030	6573 km (forecast)
2031	6780 km (forecast)
2032	approx. 7000 km (plans)
2036	approx. 8000 km (plans)
2040	approx. 8250 km – full network (plans)

== See also ==
- Classes and categories of public roads in Poland
- Transport in Poland § Road transport
- List of controlled-access highway systems
- Evolution of motorway construction in European nations
