= Expressway S51 (Poland) =

Road in Poland

Expressway S51
- Droga ekspresowa S51

Route information
- Length: 34 km (21 mi)

Major junctions
- From: Olsztyn
- To: S 7 in Olsztynek

Location
- Country: Poland
- Major cities: Olsztyn

Highway system
- National roads in Poland; Voivodeship roads
← S 50	→ S 52

Expressway S51 or Express road S51 is a short road in Poland which connects Olsztyn with the express road S7 in Olsztynek. Its length is 34 km (21 mi) and it forms a single continuous route with S16, which begins at the endpoint of S51 near Olsztyn.

== History ==
Express road S51 has been continuously part of Polish plans for express roads network since 2004. In February 2008 the Olsztyn division of GDDKIA revealed the construction project of expressway S51. In September 2012 the part of the expressway forming the 12 km (7.5 mi) bypass of Olsztynek and its connection to the S7 expressway was opened to traffic whilst the finishing works to this stretch of the expressway were done over October 2012. In December 2017 the full section of expressway between Olsztynek and Olsztyn opened to traffic. In July 2019, bypass of Olsztyn (S16/S51) was finished, making S51 complete. The majority of Expressway S51 shadows the previous route of national road 51.
