= Expressway S16 (Poland) =

Planned road in Poland

Expressway S16
- Droga ekspresowa S16

Route information
- Length: 14.7 km (9.1 mi) 230 km (140 mi) planned

Major junctions
- From: S51 near Olsztyn
- To: S61 near Ełk

Location
- Country: Poland
- Regions: Kuyavian-Pomeranian, Warmian-Masurian
- Major cities: Olsztyn, Ełk

Highway system
- National roads in Poland; Voivodeship roads
← S 14	→ S 17

Expressway S16 is a planned Polish highway. It is known that it may have briefly appeared first in Polish government long range planning documents around 2005 (there is some confusion on this point) but was subsequently dropped from construction plans. In October 2015 the route was added to the list of expressways by ministry ordinance.

== See also ==
- Highways in Poland
