= Expressway S52 (Poland) =

Polish highway under construction

Expressway S52
- Droga ekspresowa S52

Route information
- Part of E75
- Maintained by GDDKiA
- Length: 60.1 km (37.3 mi) 116 km (72 mi) planned

Major junctions
- West end: D48 at the Czech border
- DK 81 near Cieszyn; S 1 near Bielsko-Biała
- East end: S 7 in Kraków

Location
- Country: Poland
- Major cities: Cieszyn, Bielsko-Biała, Kraków

Highway system
- National roads in Poland; Voivodeship roads
← S 51	→ S 61

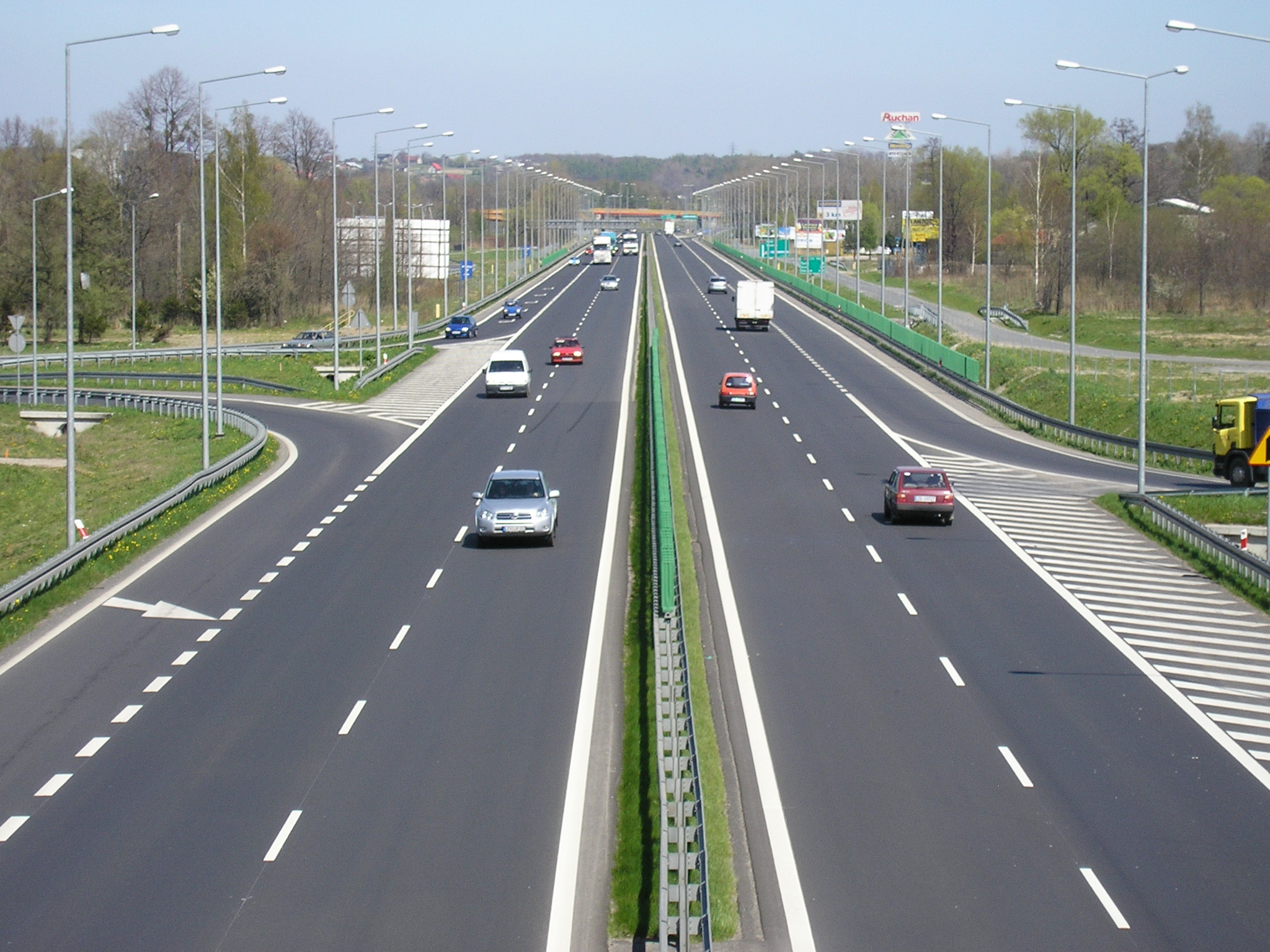
Express road S52 in Bielsko-Biała

Expressway S52 is a Polish highway under construction with a planned length of 116 km (72 mi), located in the Silesian and Lesser Poland voivodeships. Upon completion it will connect the border of the Czech Republic in Cieszyn (along with the D48 motorway) with Kraków.

The section from the border with the Czech Republic to Bielsko-Biała is completed. From Bielsko-Biała to Głogoczów (joining with the dual-carriageway national road 7 towards Kraków) the design is ongoing and the road is planned to get completed in 2032.

The separate section also numbered S52 is the northern bypass of Kraków, which is completed since 2024.

== Road numbering ==
Before 2016, the section from Bielsko-Biała to the state border in Cieszyn was part of the expressway S1. This section was renumbered to S52 when the S1 was rerouted over expressway S69.

From 1999 to 2004, the first constructed section of Kraków northern bypass (from interchange with A4 in Balice to Modlniczka) was designated as the A41 motorway, although the route number was not shown on maps and road atlases at that time.

== Route description ==
=== Cieszyn - Bielsko-Biała ===
Number of exit(facility)	Name	Mileage from beginning	History of construction	Notes
1)	Suchy Potok (planned)	0 km	With environmental decision	To the Bielsko-Biała-Komorowice interchange parallel to, eastern terminus
2)	Bielsko-Biała - Rosta	1.6 km (0.99 mi)	The contract was signed in October 2008, works started in 2009.	
3)	Bielsko-Biała Komorowice	4.5 km (2.80 mi)	Works from Bielsko-Biała-Rosta to this interchange were allowed on 5.05.2009	
4)	Bielsko-Biała - Andersa	7.0 km (4.35 mi)	Constructed 06.2003-10.2006	
5)	Bielsko-Biała - Francuska	8.3 km (5.16 mi)	Constructed 06.2003-10.2006	Exit to the shopping center
6)	Bielsko-Biała - Wapienica	9.6 km (5.97 mi)	Constructed 06.2003-10.2006	
7)(1)	Jasienica	13.9 km (8.64 mi)	Constructed 06.2003-10.2006	Exit to rest area(westbound)(restaurant, petrol station); interchange both ways
8)(2)	Świętoszówka	16.4 km (10.19 mi)	Constructed 11.2004-11.2006	Exit to rest area(eastbound)(restaurant, petrol station); exit eastbound only
9)(3)	No name	20.7 km (12.86 mi)	Constructed 11.2004-11.2006	Exit to rest area(eastbound)(restaurant, petrol station); exit eastbound only, exit to Grodziec via a gravel road
10)	Skoczów-I	22.4 km (13.92 mi)	Constructed 06.2003-11.2007	Construction was delayed because of the bankruptcy of the first contractor
11)	Skoczów-II	23.3 km (14.48 mi)	Constructed 06.2003-11.2007	
12)	MOP Gumna	31.7 km (19.70 mi)	Constructed 10.2002-10.2005	Rest area(restaurant, petrol station)
13)	Cieszyn Wschód	33.0 km (20.51 mi)	Constructed 1991–1995, renovation 11.2006-10.2007	
(4)	MOP Cieszyn	35.3 km (21.93 mi)	Constructed 1991–1995, renovation 11.2006-10.2007	Rest area(restaurant, petrol station, motel)
14)	Cieszyn Zachód	36.3 km (22.56 mi)	Constructed 1991–1995, renovation 11.2006-10.2007	
15)	Cieszyn Pastwiska	36.8 km (22.87 mi)	Constructed 1991–1995, renovation 11.2006-10.2007	Last interchange before the border, exit only westbound, entrance only eastbound.
	Former border checkpoint "Cieszyn"	37.4 km (23.24 mi)		Entrance to Czech Republic
	Poland Czech Republic	38.3 km (23.80 mi)		Bridge over the Olza river

== See also ==
- Highways in Poland
