= Olimpijka =

Location
- Country: Poland
- Regions: East Germany; Poland; Soviet Union
- Major cities: Berlin; Poznań; Łódź; Warsaw; Minsk; Moscow

Highway system
- National roads in Poland; Voivodeship roads

Olimpijka was an informal name for the planned in 1970s motorway connecting Berlin with Moscow. One of the reasons for the decision to build the highway were the then-upcoming 1980 Summer Olympics in Moscow. The decision was made that in Poland, the new highway would be built between Września and Warsaw. From the 1970s there was already a modernized to dual carriageway road stretch of E8 route (currently national road 92) around Poznań, with length of about 66 kilometres (41 mi) that ended in Września, which determined the choice of starting point of the motorway.

At first (1976) the construction was started on two fragments: Września – Konin and Nieborów – Warsaw. The first one was the only one that – with a large delay – was made during the times of Polish People's Republic. The construction near Nieborów had been abandoned in 1980. Currently both fragments of Olimpijka are part of motorway A2.

== Polish part of Olimpijka ==
=== Września — Konin stretch ===
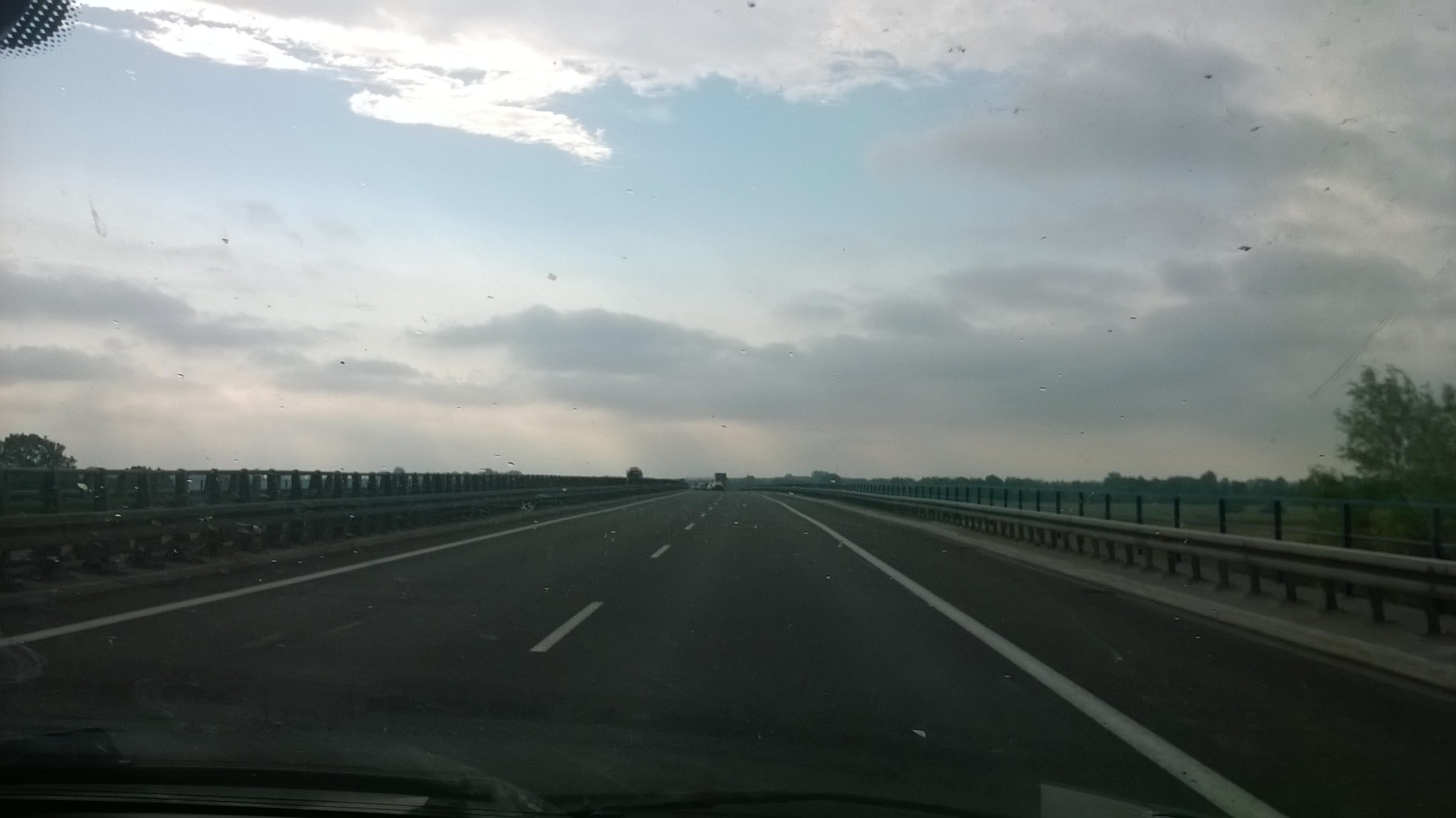
Motorway bridge over Warta near Sługocin, opened in the second half of 1980s

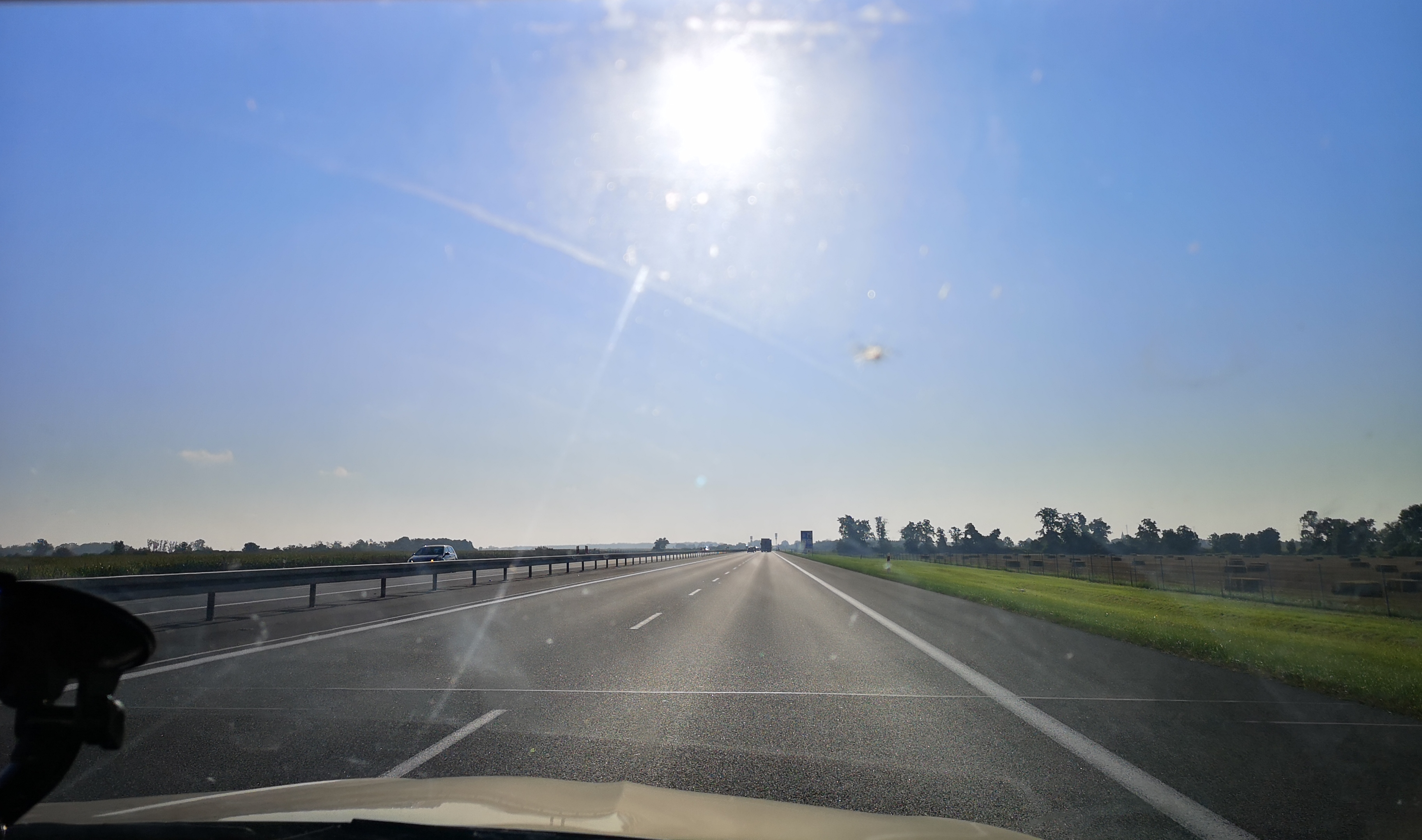
View on the former highway landing strip Września

Construction works on this stretch were very slow and the first fragment, from Września to Sługocin (34 kilometres (21 mi)) was opened in 1985. Until 1989 the motorway has been extended to Konin (additional 14 kilometres (8.7 mi)). At present, it is part of motorway A2.

As this fragment of highway was constructed during the Cold War, the military function of mighty strip of solid ground was not forgotten. About 2 kilometres (1.2 mi) east of Września, both carriageways were designated only by road markings on 27 metres (30 yd)-wide piece of asphalt, which allowed to create a highway strip, with length of 2.5 kilometres (1.6 mi), that contained aprons on both ends. This specific road structure still exists, however appended with traffic barriers between carriageways and separating traffic from now-disused aprons.

=== Nieborów — Warszawa stretch ===
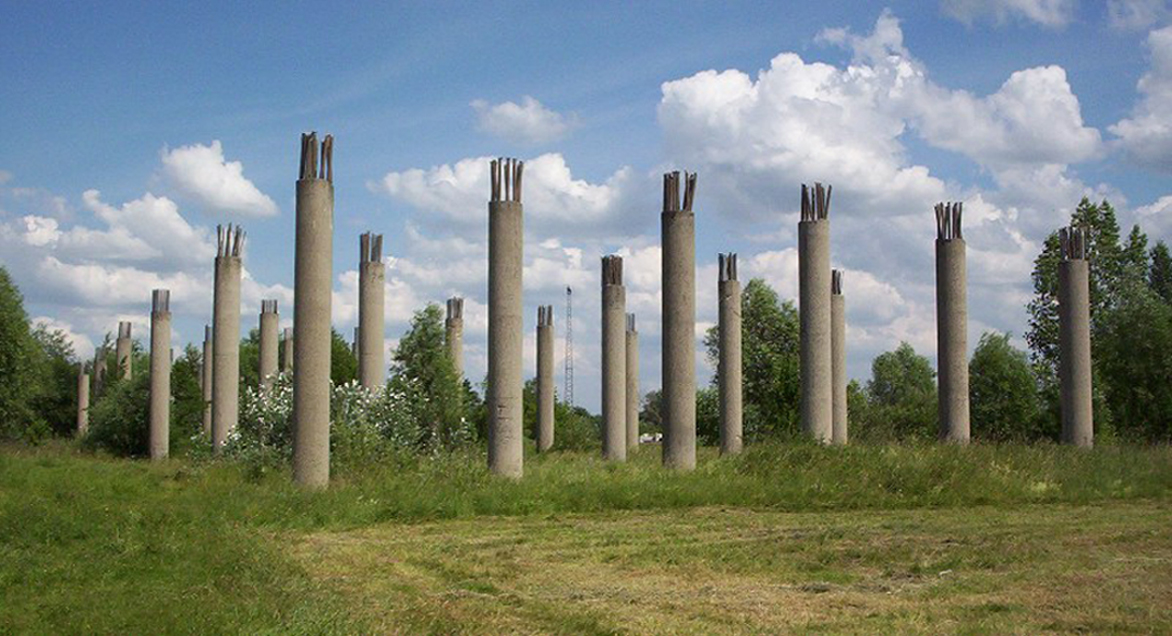
The support beams of unfinished viaduct over unbuilt northern branch of Central Railway Line, destroyed in 2010. The photo was taken in July 2005.

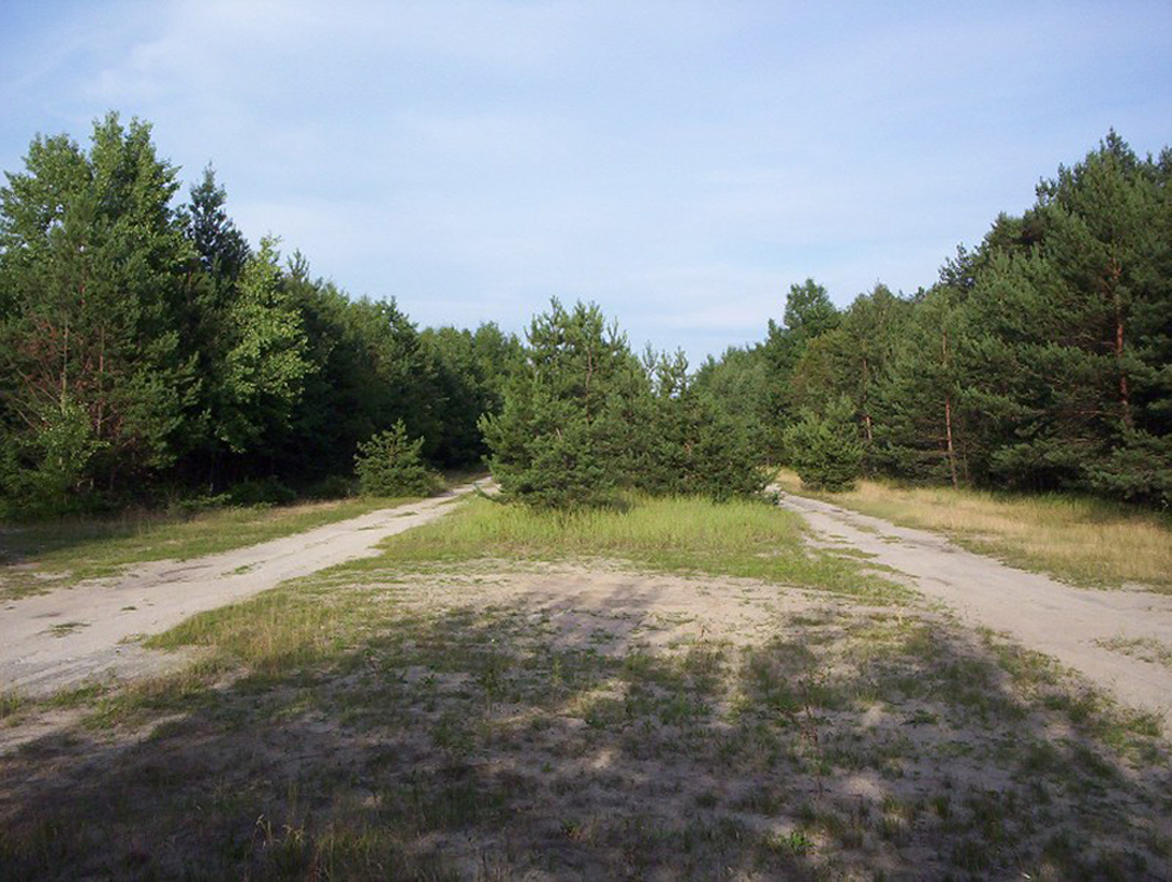
No longer existing dual carriageway unpaved track in Bolimów Forest. The photo was taken in August 2005.

This part of Olimpijka was unfinished until 2010, however there were some viaducts, bridges and culverts, a glade in Bolimów Forest (with a forest road that had remnants of asphalt) and 700 metres (770 yd) of asphalt road to nowhere. One of the structures were rows of pillars that were supposed to carry a viaduct over then-proposed northern branch of Central Railway Line towards Gdańsk (which was never constructed). On some road maps the Bolimów – Wiskitki stretch was marked as highway in construction. On almost entire length was an unpaved track, used by local population. Traces of earthworks and forestry work were visible on satellite imagery and aerial pictures to Stryków.

In January 2010, as part of preparation to construction of motorway A2, deforestation was started, with additional works related to dismantling of then-existing viaducts. On 23 June 2010 the first of remnants was destroyed – unfinished viaduct on the edge of Bolimów Forest, by blowing up. This fragment was opened to traffic in 2012.

On the night of 6–7 June 2012 the last section of constructed motorway has been opened near Wiskitki. It made possible to drive on former Olimpijka – 36 years after beginning of the first construction – from Warsaw through Poznań to Berlin and further without leaving the motorway.

== See also ==
- A2 autostrada (Poland)
- M1 highway (Belarus)
- Berlinka
