= A4 autostrada (Poland) =

Southern east-west Polish autostrada

Autostrada A4

Route information
- Part of E40
- Length: 669 km (416 mi)

Major junctions
- From: A4 - Polish-German Border at Görlitz-Zgorzelec
- A18 near Krzyżowa S3 near Legnica; A8 and S8 near Wrocław; A1 near Gliwice; S1 near Mysłowice; S7 and S52 near Kraków S19 near Rzeszów
- To: Polish-Ukrainian border at Korczowa-Krakovets - M10

Location
- Country: Poland
- Regions: Lower Silesian Voivodeship; Opole Voivodeship; Silesian Voivodeship; Lesser Poland Voivodeship; Podkarpackie Voivodeship
- Major cities: Wrocław, Gliwice, Katowice, Kraków, Rzeszów

Highway system
- National roads in Poland; Voivodeship roads
| ← A 2 | → A 6 |

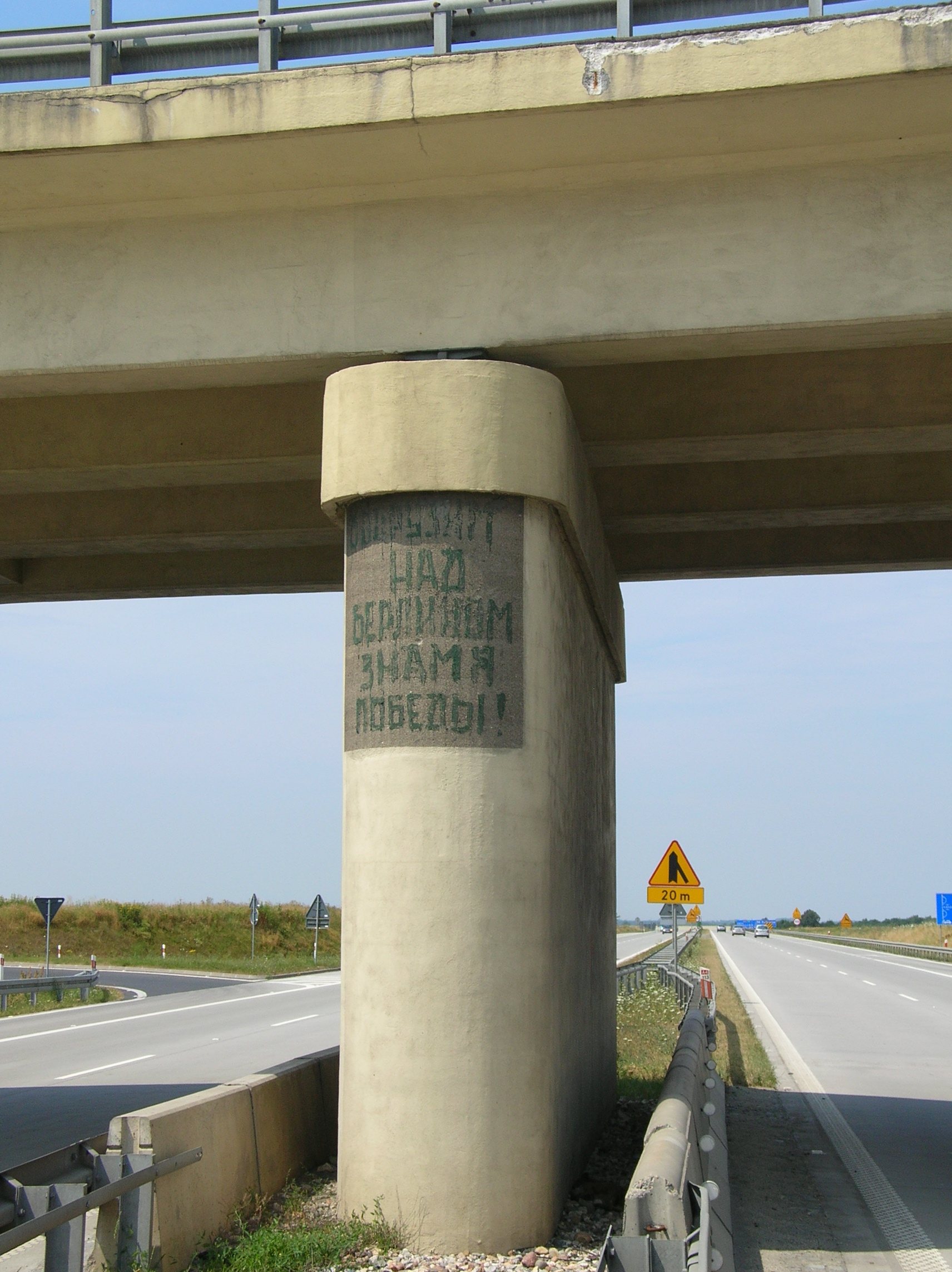
Inscription made by Soviet soldiers in 1945: Водрузим над Берлином знамя победы (We shall hoist the flag of victory over Berlin); A4 west of Wrocław.

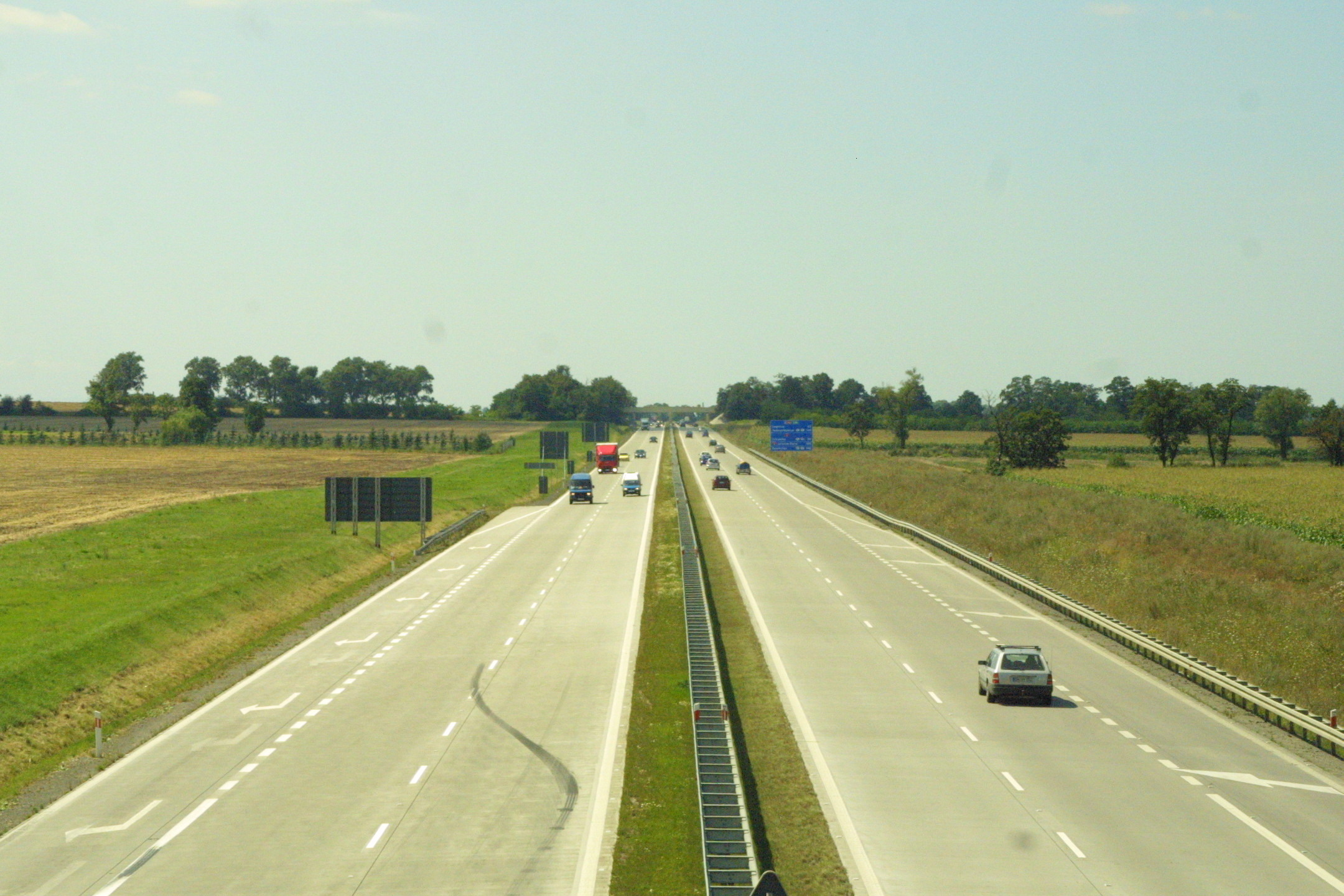
A4 west of Wrocław with repaved concrete surface

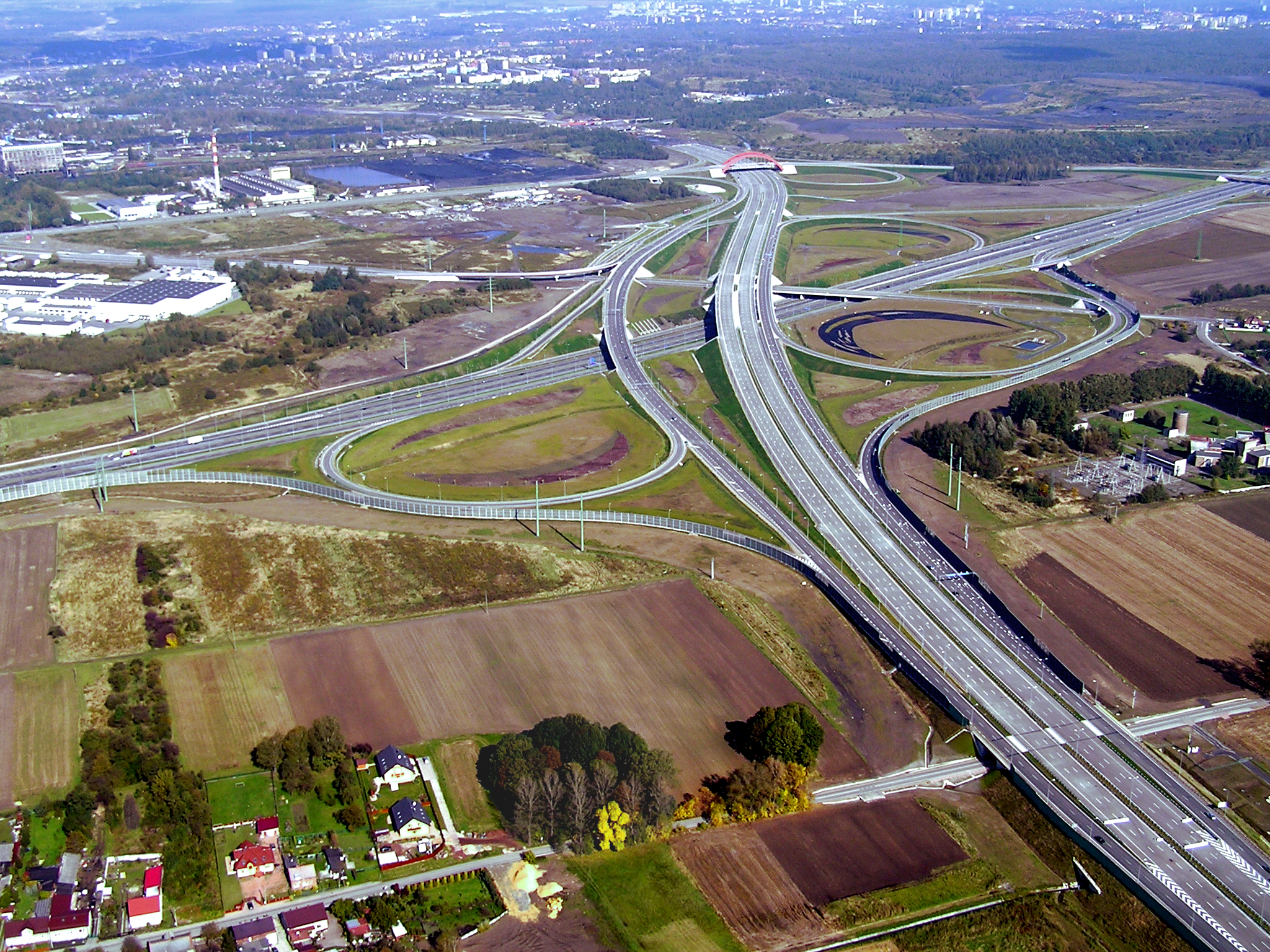
Southern part of Gliwice-Sosnica junction (joining A1 motorway, A4 motorway, national road 44, voivodeship road 902 and a local road exiting Gliwice) - the largest motorway junction in Poland, opened 2009-2010

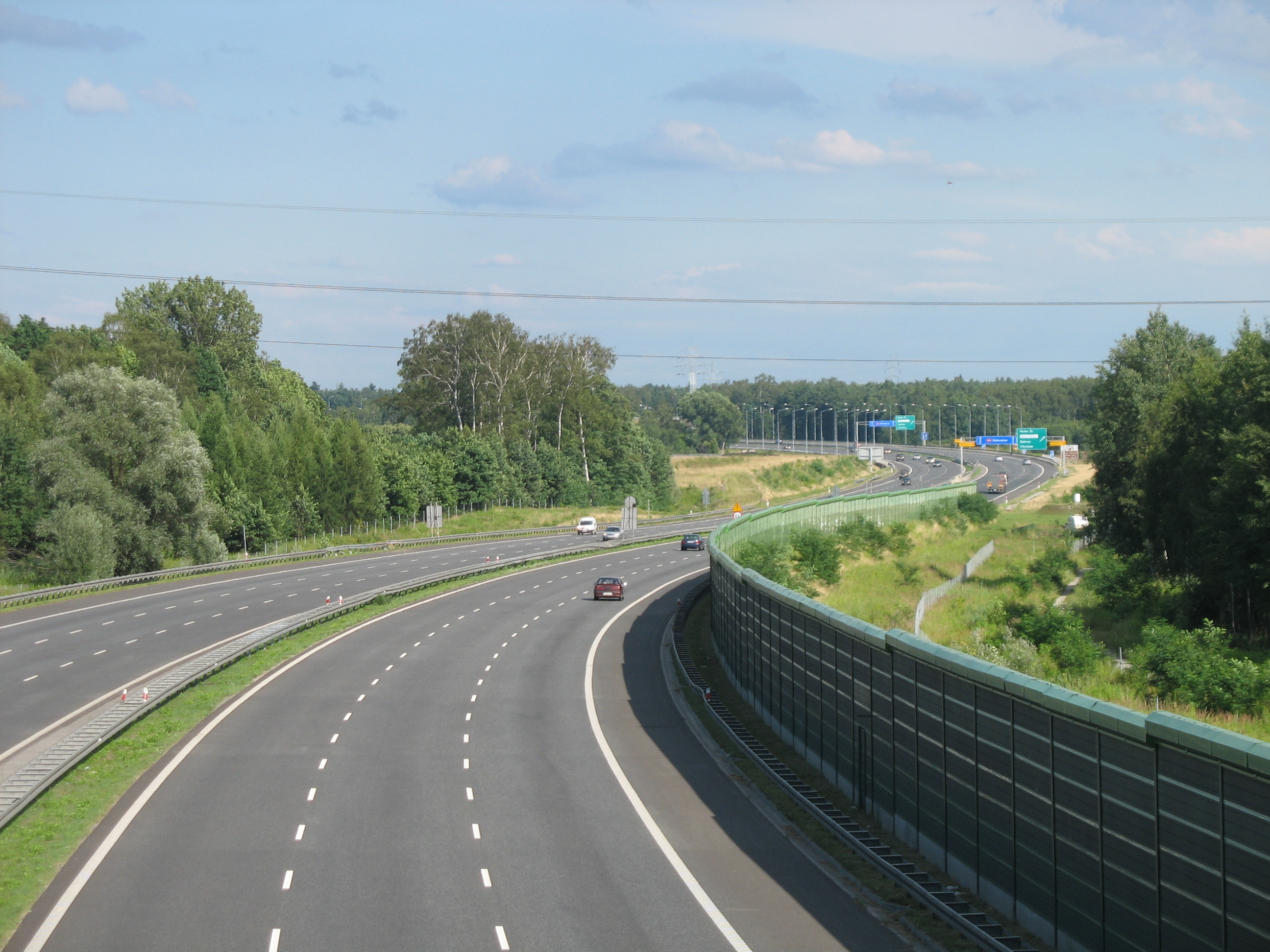
A4 in Zabrze, opened 2005

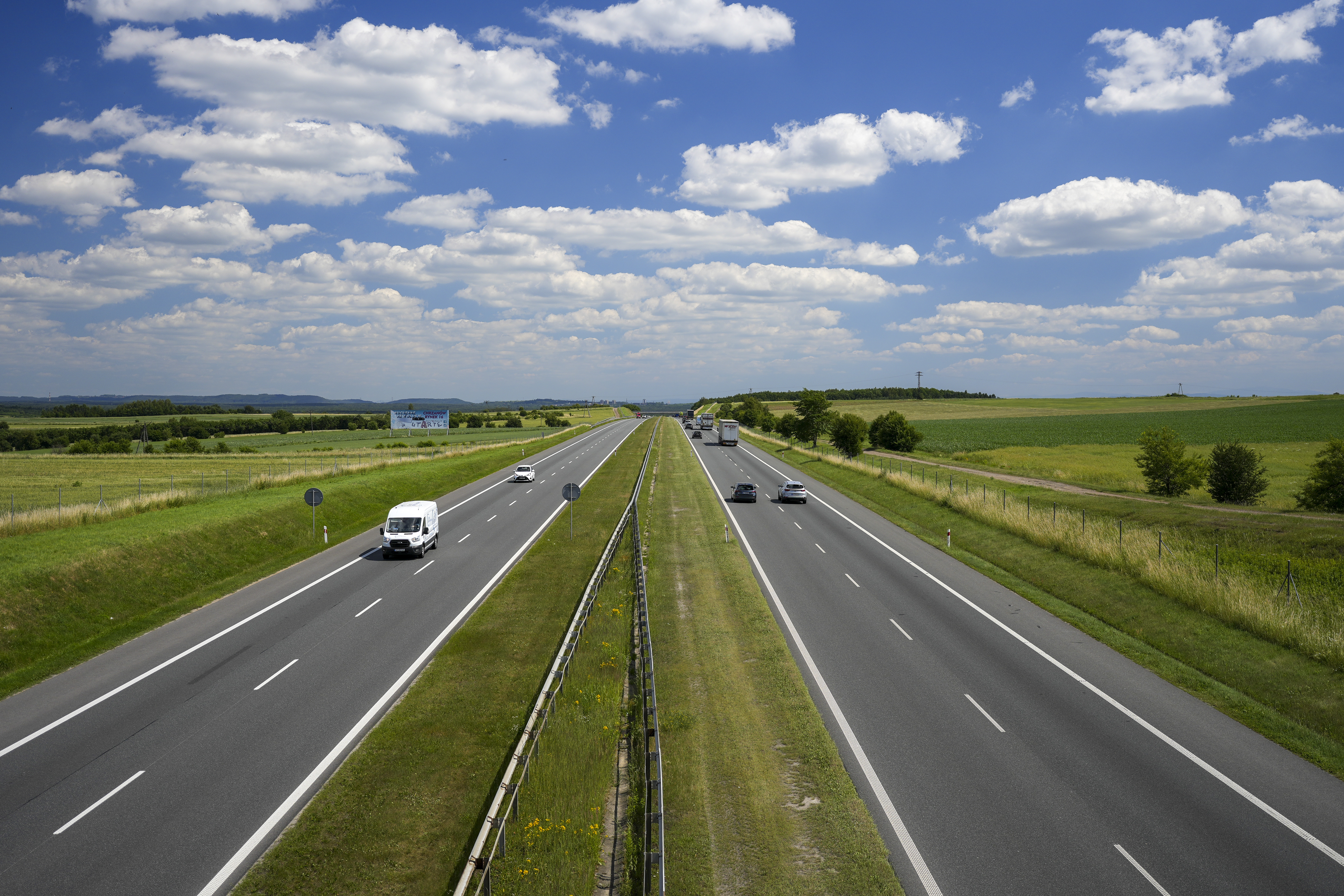
A4 near Jaworzno, opened 1980

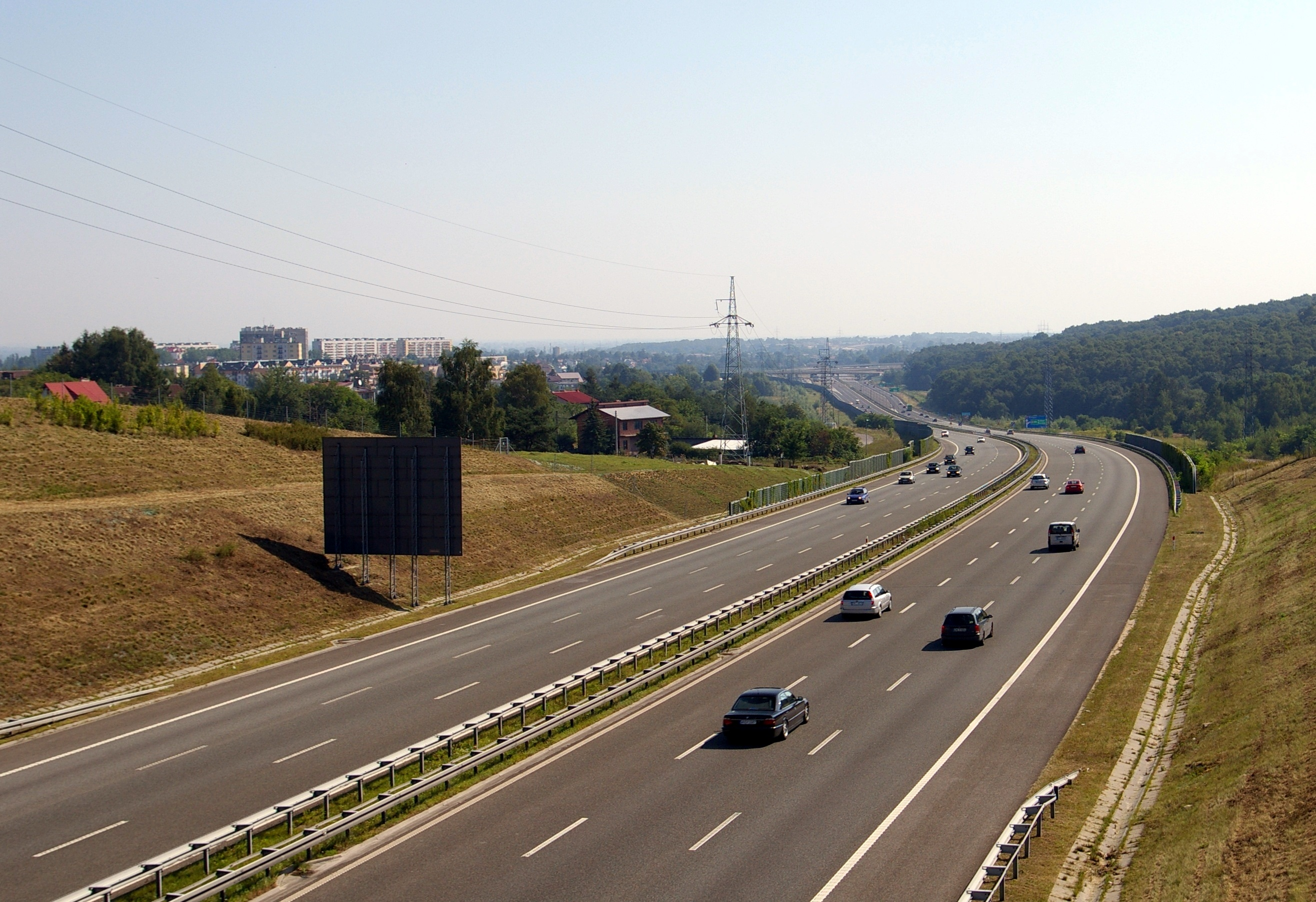
A4, part of Kraków bypass, opened 2002-2003

The A4 autostrada in Poland is a 669 km (416 mi) long east–west motorway that runs through southern Poland, along the northern side the Sudetes and Carpathian Mountains, from the Polish-German border at Zgorzelec-Görlitz (connecting to the A4 autobahn), through Wrocław, Opole, Gliwice, Katowice, Kraków, Tarnów and Rzeszów, to the Polish-Ukrainian border at Korczowa-Krakovets (connecting to the M10). It is a part of European route E40 and Pan-European Corridor III.

The motorway between Wrocław and Kraków (270 km (170 mi)) was constructed between 1976 and 2005. The part from Mysłowice to Kraków is tolled (see Tolls).

The section from the German border to Wrocław (151 km (94 mi), not tolled) was constructed between 2002 and 2009, in large part as repavement of the old concrete motorway constructed from 1933 to 1937 (then the territory of Nazi Germany). The repaved parts are substandard due to lack of emergency lanes and the speed limit is decreased to 110 km/h.

The motorway from Kraków to the Ukrainian border (251 km (156 mi), not tolled) was constructed between 2010 and 2016, making A4 the first Polish complete border-to-border highway connection.

== History of construction ==
Some western stretches of this motorway were initially built as a Reichsautobahn by Nazi Germany in the 1930s under her interwar borders. After the Second World War and the takeover of Poland by the communist regime, with her new borders, the existing roads received minimal maintenance and upgrades and became notorious for their poor quality, a phenomenon similar to that observed in East Germany. In effect, the original road served in a virtually unchanged state throughout the whole communist period and the first years afterwards. Reconstruction between 2002 and 2006 removed the old concrete road surface (earlier, a short fragment of A18 was reconstructed between 1993 and 1995, of which 10 km (6.2 mi) are now part of A4), but some aspects of the 1930s standards of construction remain on the stretch from Krzyżowa to Wrocław; for example, the aforementioned section does not have emergency lanes, a feature that is to be added in the future.

The section between Katowice and Kraków was built from 1976 to 1996, and the section between Wrocław and Katowice from 1996 to 2005. Between 2006 and 2009, the section from the German border to the junction with A18 motorway was constructed, which completed a continuous connection from Germany to Kraków.

Also completed in 2009 was the first portion of the motorway east of Kraków (20 km). The original plan was to finish the rest of the motorway by about 2013, but because of the UEFA decision to host the 2012 UEFA European Football Championship in Poland and Ukraine and the resulting need to improve the road infrastructure connecting the two countries, the date for opening the motorway to traffic was moved up to June 2012. This ambitious target was not attained after multiple delays, some caused by the floods of 2010. In July 2016, the last missing section of 41 km (25 mi) between Rzeszów and Jarosław was completed. This meant the entire length of the A4 from the German border to the Ukrainian border was completed, making the A4 the first complete major motorway in Poland (second overall, behind the very short A8) and the first completed continuous border-to-border highway connection.

== Sections of the motorway ==
| Motorway section | Length | Constructed | Note |
|---|---|---|---|
| Jędrzychowice (border) - Zgorzelec | 1.7 km (1.1 mi) | 1994–1996 | heavy-load trucks only in 1994, all cars since 1996 |
| Zgorzelec - Krzyżowa | 50 km (31 mi) | 2007–2009 | |
| Krzyżowa - Bielany Wrocławskie | 99 km (62 mi) | 1933–1937 | repaved in 2002 – 2006 (short fragment in 1993 – 1995); section without emergency lanes |
| Bielany Wrocławskie - Przylesie (Brzeg) | 40.7 km (25.3 mi) | 1997–2000 | first carriageway built 1936 – 1938; reconstructed and second carriageway added in 1997 – 2000 |
| Przylesie (Brzeg) - Nogowczyce | 84.5 km (52.5 mi) | 2000–2003 | some unfinished construction before 1945 |
| Nogowczyce - Kleszczów | 17.9 km (11.1 mi) | 2001–2003 | first carriageway built 1936 – 1942; (Note: It continued from Kleszczów into Gliwice and today that section is National Road 88, while A4 bypasses Gliwice to the south) reconstructed and second carriageway added in 2001 – 2003 |
| Kleszczów - Katowice Murckowska | 43 km (27 mi) | 1996–2005 | |
| Katowice Murckowska - Mysłowice | 6.3 km (3.9 mi) | 1989–1996 | |
| Mysłowice - Kraków Balice | 53.7 km (33.4 mi) | 1976–1991 | private operator and tolls since 2000 |
| Kraków Balice - Kraków Wieliczka | 24 km (15 mi) | 1979–2003 | |
| Kraków Wieliczka - Szarów | 20 km (12 mi) | 2007–2009 | |
| Szarów - Tarnów | 57 km (35 mi) | 2010–2013 | opened to traffic in November, 2012, in part with single carriageway only. Both carriageways were fully opened in May, 2013. |
| Tarnów Północ - Dębica Wschód | 34.8 km (21.6 mi) | 2010–2014 | opened Oct 30/31, 2014. |
| Dębica Wschód - Rzeszów Północ | 41 km (25 mi) | 2010–2013 | opened in October, 2013 |
| Rzeszów Północ - Rzeszów Wschód | 6.9 km (4.3 mi) | 2010–2012 | opened in September, 2012 |
| Rzeszów Wschód - Jarosław Zachód | 41.2 km (25.6 mi) | 2010–2016 | originally planned to finish in 2012, delayed until 2014, then contractor abandoned the contract in January 2014 when 70% complete due to dispute with the government over financing. New contract was awarded in September, with construction beginning in October 2014. Opened in July, 2016. |
| Jarosław Zachód - Korczowa | 47.1 km (29.3 mi) | 2010–2013 | originally planned to finish in 2012, opened in May 2013 (Jarosław Wschód - Radymno) and December 2013 (remaining parts) |

== Route description ==
| Country | Voivodeship | Location | km | mi | Exit | Name | Destinations | Notes |
|---|---|---|---|---|---|---|---|---|
| Poland | Lower Silesian Voivodeship | Zgorzelec | 0.0 | 0.0 | — | Germany–Poland border | A 4 / E40 | Border with Germany Western endpoint of motorway Kilometrage starting point Western terminus of E40 continues towards Dresden |
| Poland | Lower Silesian Voivodeship | Gmina Zgorzelec | 1.8 | 1.1 | 1 | Zgorzelec | DK 30 DK 94 – Zgorzelec/Jelenia Góra | |
| Poland | Lower Silesian Voivodeship | Gmina Zgorzelec | 7.8 | 4.8 | Rest area | MOP Żarska Wieś | Żarska Wieś rest area | restaurant and motel eastbound petrol station both ways |
| Poland | Lower Silesian Voivodeship | Gmina Nowogrodziec | 17.9 | 11.1 | 2 | Godzieszów | DW 296 – Lubań/Żagań | DK94 can be accessed by DW296 |
| Poland | Lower Silesian Voivodeship | Gmina Nowogrodziec | 26.0 | 16.2 | Parking area | MOP Czerna | Czerna parking area | parking only |
| Poland | Lower Silesian Voivodeship | Gmina Bolesławiec | 44.6 | 27.7 | 3 | Bolesławiec | DW 297 – Jelenia Góra/Bolesławiec/Nowa Sól | |
| Poland | Lower Silesian Voivodeship | Gmina Bolesławiec | 46.2 | 28.7 | Rest area | MOP Kraśnik Dolny | Kraśnik Dolny rest area | eastbound only restaurant, motel and petrol station |
| Poland | Lower Silesian Voivodeship | Gmina Bolesławiec | 49.8 | 30.9 | 4 | Krzyżowa interchange | A 18 / E36 – Olszyna/Berlin | trumpet interchange |
| Poland | Lower Silesian Voivodeship | Gmina Gromadka | 56.0 | 34.8 | 5 | LSSE Obszar Krzywa | LSSE Obszar Krzywa/Szczytnica | LSSE means Special economic zone (SEZ) |
| Poland | Lower Silesian Voivodeship | Gmina Chojnów | 62.0 | 38.5 | 6 | Krzywa | DK 94 – Legnica/Bolesławiec/Zgorzelec | |
| Poland | Lower Silesian Voivodeship | Gmina Zagrodno | 66.6 | 41.4 | — | Jadwisin | Jadwisin/Witkówek | Junction will be removed in the future |
| Poland | Lower Silesian Voivodeship | Gmina Chojnów | 73.0 | 45.4 | 7 | Chojnów | DW 328 – Złotoryja/Chojnów | |
| Poland | Lower Silesian Voivodeship | Gmina Chojnów | 76.6 | 47.6 | Parking area | MOP Strupice | Strupice parking area | Parking area will be removed in the future |
| Poland | Lower Silesian Voivodeship | Gmina Złotoryja | 79.9 | 49.6 | — | Lubiatów | Lubiatów/Łukaszów | Junction will be removed in the future |
| Poland | Lower Silesian Voivodeship | Gmina Krotoszyce | 83.6 | 51.9 | 8 | Złotoryja | DW 364 – Legnica/Złotoryja | |
| Poland | Lower Silesian Voivodeship | Gmina Krotoszyce | 86.6 | 53.8 | 9 | Legnica Południe interchange | S 3 / E65 – Legnica/Jelenia Góra | double trumpet interchange Południe means South |
| Poland | Lower Silesian Voivodeship | Legnica | 91.9 | 57.1 | 10 | Legnica Wschód | DW 320 DW 333 – Legnica/Jawor | |
| Poland | Lower Silesian Voivodeship | Gmina Legnickie Pole | 97.0 | 60.3 | — | Legnickie Pole | Legnickie Pole | exit and entrance only eastbound Junction will be removed in the future |
| Poland | Lower Silesian Voivodeship | Gmina Legnickie Pole | 99.6 | 61.9 | — | Mikołajowice | Snowidza/Koskowice/Legnickie Pole | Junction will be removed in the future Legnickie Pole only signed westbound |
| Poland | Lower Silesian Voivodeship | Gmina Wądroże Wielkie | 104.7 | 65.1 | — | Wądroże Wielkie | Wądroże Wielkie/Jawor/Prochowice | Junction will be removed in the future |
| Poland | Lower Silesian Voivodeship | Gmina Wądroże Wielkie | 112.1 | 69.7 | 11 | Budziszów | DW 345 – Strzegom/Rawicz | |
| Poland | Lower Silesian Voivodeship | Gmina Udanin | 115.9 | 72.0 | — | Udanin | Ujazd Górny/Udanin | Junction will be removed in the future |
| Poland | Lower Silesian Voivodeship | Gmina Udanin | 119.7 | 74.4 | Rest area | MOP Jarosław | Jarosław rest area | exit and entrance only eastbound parking, restaurant, and shower facilities Rest area will be removed in the future |
| Poland | Lower Silesian Voivodeship | Gmina Udanin | 120.1 | 74.6 | — | Gościsław | Jarosław/Gościsław | Junction will be removed in the future |
| Poland | Lower Silesian Voivodeship | Gmina Kostomłoty | 125.1 | 77.7 | 12 | Kostomłoty | DK 5 – Lubawka/Jelenia Góra/Środa Śląska/Kostomłoty | Western End of concurrency with national road 5 |
| Poland | Lower Silesian Voivodeship | Gmina Kąty Wrocławskie | 137.4 | 85.4 | 13 | Kąty Wrocławskie | DW 347 – Kąty Wrocławskie/Mietków | |
| Poland | Lower Silesian Voivodeship | Gmina Kąty Wrocławskie | | | 14 | Strzeganowice | DK 35 – Wałbrzych | planned interchange with DK35 |
| Poland | Lower Silesian Voivodeship | Gmina Kąty Wrocławskie | 147.4 | 91.6 | — | Pietrzykowice | Krzeptów/Wierzbice | Junction will be removed in the future |
| Poland | Lower Silesian Voivodeship | Gmina Kąty Wrocławskie | 150.3 | 93.4 | 15 | Wrocław Południe interchange | A 8 / E67 – Wrocław/Warsaw/Poznań/Wrocław Airport S 8 / E67 – Kudowa-Słone | modified cloverleaf interchange Południe means South |
| Poland | Lower Silesian Voivodeship | Gmina Kobierzyce | 153.1 | 95.1 | 16 | Bielany Wrocławskie | DK 5 – Wrocław; DK 35 – Wałbrzych | Eastern End of concurrency with national road 5 |
| Poland | Lower Silesian Voivodeship | Gmina Kobierzyce | 156.0 | 96.9 | — | PPO Karwiany | — | Western terminus of toll section PPO means toll station |
| Poland | Lower Silesian Voivodeship | Gmina Żórawina | 164.3 | 102.1 | 17 | Wrocław Wschód | DW 395 – Wrocław Wschód/Strzelin | Junction equipped with toll station Wschód means east |
| Poland | Lower Silesian Voivodeship | Gmina Żórawina | 166.0 | 103.1 | Parking area | MOP Wilkowice (eastbound); MOP Krajków (westbound) | Wilkowice/Krajków parking area | |
| Poland | Lower Silesian Voivodeship | Gmina Domaniów | 178.5 | 110.9 | 18 | Brzezimierz | DW 396 – Oława/Strzelin | Junction equipped with toll station |
| Poland | Lower Silesian Voivodeship | Gmina Oława | 183.7 | 114.1 | Rest area | MOP Witowice (eastbound); MOP Oleśnica Mała (westbound) | Witowice/Oleśnica Mała rest area | restaurant |
| Poland | Opole Voivodeship | Gmina Grodków | 193.7 | 120.4 | 19 | Brzeg | DW 403 – Brzeg DW 401 – Nysa | Junction equipped with toll station |
| Poland | Opole Voivodeship | Gmina Olszanka | 200.3 | 124.5 | Parking area | MOP Jankowice Wielkie | Jankowice Wielkie parking area | |
| Poland | Opole Voivodeship | Gmina Niemodlin | 218.7 | 135.9 | Rest area | MOP Młyńskie Stawy | Młyńskie Stawy rest area | motel and petrol station |
| Poland | Opole Voivodeship | Gmina Dąbrowa | 222.0 | 137.9 | 20 | Opole Zachód | DK 46 – Nysa/Opole | Junction equipped with toll station Zachód means west |
| Poland | Opole Voivodeship | Gmina Prószków | 237.2 | 147.4 | Parking area | MOP Przysiecz | Przysiecz parking area | |
| Poland | Opole Voivodeship | Gmina Krapkowice | 244.1 | 151.7 | 21 | Opole Południe | DK 45 – Opole/Racibórz/Krapkowice | Junction equipped with toll station Południe means south |
| Poland | Opole Voivodeship | Gmina Krapkowice | 251.2 | 156.1 | 22 | Krapkowice | DW 423 – Krapkowice/Kędzierzyn-Koźle/Gogolin | Junction equipped with toll station |
| Poland | Opole Voivodeship | Gmina Leśnica | 264.2 | 164.2 | Rest area | MOP Wysoka | Wysoka rest area | Shower, restaurant (KFC) and petrol station |
| Poland | Opole Voivodeship | Gmina Ujazd | 272.1 | 169.1 | 23 | Kędzierzyn-Koźle | DW 426 – Strzelce Opolskie/Kędzierzyn-Koźle | Junction equipped with toll station |
| Poland | Opole Voivodeship | Gmina Ujazd | 278.0 | 172.7 | 24 | Strzelce Opolskie | DK 88 – Strzelce Opolskie | Western End of concurrency with national road 88 Junction equipped with toll station |
| Poland | Silesian Voivodeship | Gmina Rudziniec | 287.2 | 178.5 | 25 | Łany | DK 40 – Kędzierzyn-Koźle/Pyskowice | Junction equipped with toll station |
| Poland | Silesian Voivodeship | Gmina Rudziniec | 295.8 | 183.8 | 26 | Kleszczów | DK 88 – Gliwice/Bytom | Eastern End of concurrency with national road 88 Junction equipped with toll station Toll free when using the Gliwice bypass |
| Poland | Silesian Voivodeship | Gmina Sośnicowice | 299.7 | 186.2 | Rest area | MOP Rachowice | Rachowice rest area | restaurant, petrol station |
| Poland | Silesian Voivodeship | Gliwice | 303.5 | 188.6 | 27 | Gliwice Ostropa | DW 408 – Gliwice/Kędzierzyn-Koźle | Junction equipped with toll station Toll free when using the Gliwice bypass |
| Poland | Silesian Voivodeship | Gliwice | 310.1 | 192.7 | 28 | Gliwice Bojków | DK 78 – Gliwice/Rybnik | Junction equipped with toll station Toll free when using the Gliwice bypass |
| Poland | Silesian Voivodeship | Gliwice | 311.7 | 193.7 | – | PPO Żernica | – | Eastern terminus of toll section Toll free when using the Gliwice bypass PPO means toll station |
| Poland | Silesian Voivodeship | Gliwice | 315.5 | 196.0 | 29 | Gliwice Sośnica interchange | A 1 – Łódź/Gorzyczki/Ostrava/Katowice Airport; DK 44 – Tychy DW 902 – Katowice/Gliwice | Combination interchange Western endpoint of the stretch with three lanes per carriageway |
| Poland | Silesian Voivodeship | Zabrze | 320.8 | 199.3 | 30 | Zabrze Południe | Ruda Śląska-Bielszowice/Zabrze/Chudów | Południe means south |
| Poland | Silesian Voivodeship | Ruda Śląska | 324.0 | 201.3 | 31 | Ruda Śląska | DW 925 – Ruda Śląska/Bytom/Rybnik | |
| Poland | Silesian Voivodeship | Ruda Śląska | 326.9 | 203.1 | Rest area | MOP Halemba | Halemba rest area | restaurant, petrol station and shower |
| Poland | Silesian Voivodeship | Chorzów | 331.5 | 206.0 | 32 | Chorzów | Katowice-Załęska Hałda-Osiedle Witosa/Ruda Śląska-Kochłowice/Chorzów | |
| Poland | Silesian Voivodeship | Katowice | 334.1 | 207.6 | 33 | Katowice-Mikołowska | Katowice-Centrum/Katowice-Ligota/Skoczów | Eastern endpoint of the stretch with three lanes per carriageway Centrum means center |
| Poland | Silesian Voivodeship | Katowice | 337.2 | 209.5 | 34 | Katowice-Francuska | Katowice-Centrum/Katowice-Brynów/Katowice-Muchowiec | Centrum means center |
| Poland | Silesian Voivodeship | Katowice | 339.5 | 211.0 | 35 | Katowice-Murckowska | DK 86 – Tychy/Bielsko-Biała/Sosnowiec/Częstochowa | |
| Poland | Silesian Voivodeship | Mysłowice | 345.8 | 214.9 | 36 | Mysłowice | Mysłowice | |
| Poland | Silesian Voivodeship | Mysłowice | 348.7 | 216.7 | 37 | Brzęczkowice interchange | S 1 / E75 / E462 – Cieszyn S 1 / E75 – Cieszyn/Łódź/Warsaw/Katowice Airport | Western End of concurrency with european route E462 cloverleaf interchange |
| Poland | Silesian Voivodeship | Mysłowice | 350.6 | 217.9 | – | PPO Brzęczkowice | – | Western terminus of toll section PPO means toll station |
| Poland | Silesian Voivodeship | Jaworzno | 359.0 | 223.1 | 38 | Jeleń | DW 903 – Jaworzno | Incomplete junction: no exit ramp Kraków → Jeleń; no entry ramp Jeleń → Kraków Toll junction, not equipped with toll station |
| Poland | Silesian Voivodeship | Jaworzno | 361.2 | 224.4 | Rest area | MOP Zastawie (westbound); MOP Kępnica (eastbound) | Zastawie/Kępnica rest area | petrol station, motel, TIR, restaurant, carwash |
| Poland | Silesian Voivodeship | Jaworzno | 364.6 | 226.6 | 39 | Byczyna | DK 79 – Jaworzno | Incomplete junction: no exit ramp Katowice → Byczyna; no entry ramp Byczyna → Katowice Toll junction, not equipped with toll station |
| Poland | Lesser Poland Voivodeship | Gmina Chrzanów | 388.4 | 241.3 | 40 | Balin | Oświęcim/Balin | Toll junction, not equipped with toll station |
| Poland | Lesser Poland Voivodeship | Gmina Chrzanów | 370.6 | 230.3 | 41 | Chrzanów | DK 79 – Chrzanów/Trzebinia | Toll junction, not equipped with toll station |
| Poland | Lesser Poland Voivodeship | Gmina Alwernia | 380.9 | 236.7 | 42 | Rudno | Alwernia/Krzeszowice | Toll junction, not equipped with toll station |
| Poland | Lesser Poland Voivodeship | Gmina Zabierzów | 397.5 | 247.0 | Rest area | MOP Morawica | Morawica rest area | petrol station, motel, restaurant, carwash |
| Poland | Lesser Poland Voivodeship | Gmina Zabierzów | 399.2 | 248.1 | – | PPO Balice | – | Eastern terminus of toll section PPO means toll station |
| Poland | Lesser Poland Voivodeship | Gmina Zabierzów | 400.2 | 248.7 | 43 | Balice I interchange | S 52 – Kraków DK 7 / E77 – Warsaw | Eastern End of concurrency with european route E462 Western End of concurrency with national road 7 and european route E77 trumpet interchange |
| Poland | Lesser Poland Voivodeship | Kraków | 401.7 | 249.6 | 44 | Kraków Balice | DW 774 – Kraków John Paul II International Airport/Kryspinów/Zabierzów | |
| Poland | Lesser Poland Voivodeship | Kraków | 406.4 | 252.5 | 45 | Kraków Bielany | Kraków-Centrum | Centrum means center |
| Poland | Lesser Poland Voivodeship | Gmina Liszki | 407.0 | 252.9 | – | Bridge | – | Bridge over the Vistula River |
| Poland | Lesser Poland Voivodeship | Kraków | 408.1 | 253.6 | 46 | Kraków-Tyniec | Kraków-Tyniec | |
| Poland | Lesser Poland Voivodeship | Kraków | 411.6 | 255.8 | 47 | Kraków-Skawina | DK 44 – Kraków/Oświęcim | |
| Poland | Lesser Poland Voivodeship | Kraków | 416.1 | 258.6 | 48 | Kraków-Południe | DK 7 / E77 – Chyżne/Zakopane/Kraków-Centrum | Eastern End of concurrency with national road 7 and european route E77 Południe means south Centrum means center Incomplete junction: no exit ramp Rzeszów → Kraków; no entry ramp Kraków → Rzeszów |
| Poland | Lesser Poland Voivodeship | Kraków | 418.2 | 259.9 | 49 | Kraków-Łagiewniki | Kraków-Łagiewniki | Western endpoint of the stretch with three lanes per carriageway |
| Poland | Lesser Poland Voivodeship | Kraków | 424.0 | 263.5 | 50 | Kraków-Wieliczka | DK 94 – Tarnów/Kraków-Centrum | Centrum means center |
| Poland | Lesser Poland Voivodeship | Kraków | 427.3 | 265.5 | 51 | Kraków-Bieżanów | S 7 / E77 – Warsaw (proposed)/Kraków-Wschód | Wschód means east trumpet interchange |
| Poland | Lesser Poland Voivodeship | Gmina Niepołomice | 434.6 | 270.0 | 52 | Niepołomice | DW 964 – Niepołomice/Wieliczka | |
| Poland | Lesser Poland Voivodeship | Gmina Kłaj | 443.5 | 275.6 | 53 | Targowisko | DK 75 – Targowisko/Kraków Północ | Western End of concurrency with national road 75 Północ means north |
| Poland | Lesser Poland Voivodeship | Gmina Kłaj | 448.3 | 278.6 | Rest area | MOP Kłaj | Kłaj rest area | restaurant and petrol station |
| Poland | Lesser Poland Voivodeship | Bochnia | 457.1 | 284.0 | 54 | Bochnia | Bochnia/Nowe Brzesko | |
| Poland | Lesser Poland Voivodeship | Gmina Brzesko | 466.9 | 290.1 | 55 | Brzesko | DK 75 – Brzesko/Nowy Sącz DW 768 – Koszyce | Eastern End of concurrency with national road 75 |
| Poland | Lesser Poland Voivodeship | Gmina Wierzchosławice | 487.5 | 302.9 | 56 | Tarnów Mościce | DW 973 – Tarnów-Mościce DW 975 – Wojnicz/Dąbrowa Tarnowska | |
| Poland | Lesser Poland Voivodeship | Tarnów | 500.8 | 311.2 | 57 | Tarnów Centrum | DK 73 – Tarnów-Centrum/Jasło/Kielce/Dąbrowa Tarnowska | Centrum means center |
| Poland | Subcarpathian Voivodeship | Gmina Żyraków | 530.5 | 329.6 | 58 | Dębica Zachód | Dębica | Zachód means west |
| Poland | Subcarpathian Voivodeship | Gmina Dębica | 536.9 | 333.6 | 59 | Dębica Wschód | DW 985 – Dębica/Mielec | Wschód means east |
| Poland | Subcarpathian Voivodeship | Gmina Sędziszów Małopolski | 551.6 | 342.7 | 60 | Sędziszów | Ropczyce DK 94/Sędziszów Małopolski | |
| Poland | Subcarpathian Voivodeship | Gmina Świlcza | 564.9 | 351.0 | Rest area | MOP Bratkowice | Bratkowice rest area | facilities (parking and toilet); further planned |
| Poland | Subcarpathian Voivodeship | Gmina Świlcza | 570.3 | 354.4 | 61 | Rzeszów Zachód interchange | S 19 / E371 – Rzeszów/Barwinek | Western End of concurrency with expressway S19 and european route E371 double trumpet interchange with unused northern end Zachód means west |
| Poland | Subcarpathian Voivodeship | Gmina Głogów Małopolski | 574.4 | 356.9 | 62 | Rzeszów Północ | DK 9 – Rzeszów DK 9 / E371 – Warsaw/Radom | Eastern End of concurrency with european route E371 Północ means north |
| Poland | Subcarpathian Voivodeship | Gmina Trzebownisko | 581.2 | 361.1 | 63 | Rzeszów Wschód interchange | S 19 – Lublin; DK 97 – Rzeszów | Eastern End of concurrency with expressway S19 double trumpet interchange Wschód means east |
| Poland | Subcarpathian Voivodeship | Gmina Czarna | 593.1 | 368.5 | 64 | Łańcut | DW 877 – Łańcut/Leżajsk | |
| Poland | Subcarpathian Voivodeship | Gmina Przeworsk | 612.6 | 380.7 | 65 | Przeworsk | DW 835 – Przeworsk/Lublin | |
| Poland | Subcarpathian Voivodeship | Gmina Przeworsk | 622.5 | 386.8 | 66 | Jarosław Zachód | DK 94 – Jarosław/Korczowa/Rzeszów | |
| Poland | Subcarpathian Voivodeship | Gmina Pawłosiów | 631.7 | 392.5 | 67 | Jarosław Wschód | DW 880 – Jarosław/Pruchnik | |
| Poland | Subcarpathian Voivodeship | Gmina Radymno | 646.7 | 401.8 | 68 | Przemyśl | DK 77 – Jarosław/Przemyśl | |
| Poland | Subcarpathian Voivodeship | Gmina Radymno | 666.3 | 414.0 | 69 | Korczowa | DK 94 – Jarosław/Rzeszów | |
| Poland | Subcarpathian Voivodeship | Gmina Radymno | 668.9 | 415.6 | — | Poland–Ukraine border | M 10 / E40 | Border with Ukraine Eastern endpoint of motorway Eastern terminus of E40 continues towards Lviv |
1.000 mi = 1.609 km; 1.000 km = 0.621 mi: Concurrency terminus; Incomplete access; Proposed; Tolled; Route transition

== See also ==
- Highways in Poland
- European route E40
