= A18 autostrada (Poland) =

Motorway in Poland

Autostrada A18

Route information
- Part of E36
- Maintained by GDDKiA
- Length: 76.5 km (47.5 mi)

Major junctions
- From: A 15 at border with Germany at Forst-Bademeusel/Olszyna
- To: A 4 near Krzyżowa

Location
- Country: Poland
- Major cities: Żary

Highway system
- National roads in Poland; Voivodeship roads
← A 8	→ A 50

Autostrada A18 is a short motorway in southwestern Poland which runs from the Polish/German border at Olszyna/Forst-Bademeusel (connecting with the German Bundesautobahn 15) to the Polish Autostrada A4. The highway is 76.5 km (47.5 mi) long and is part of the European route E36 and the Pan-European corridor IIIA from Berlin to Wrocław. Since 2023, both carriageways are opened after reconstruction and signed as A18.

== Construction ==
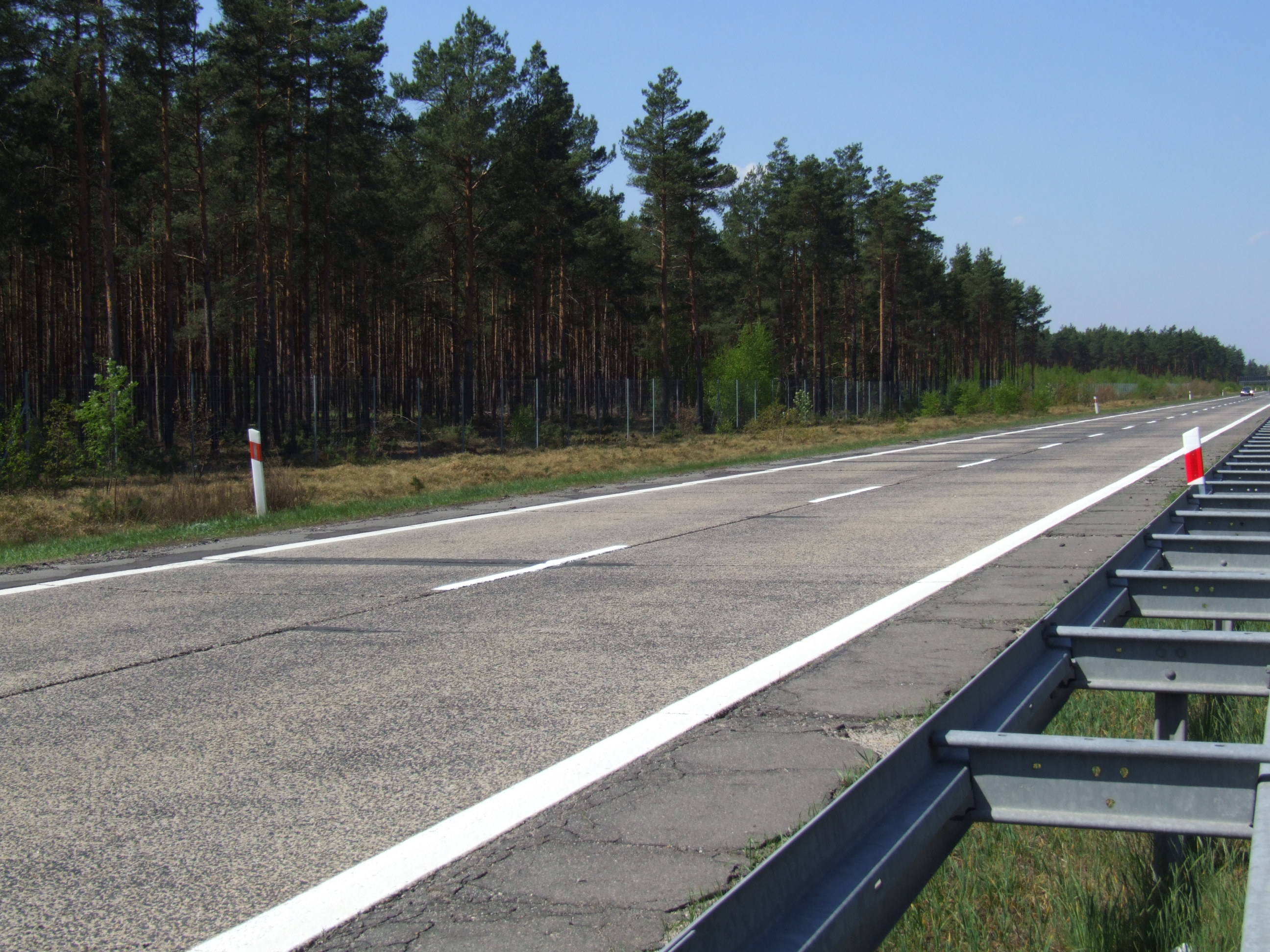
The Reichsautobahn from the 1930s had served as the east-bound carriageway until 2021.

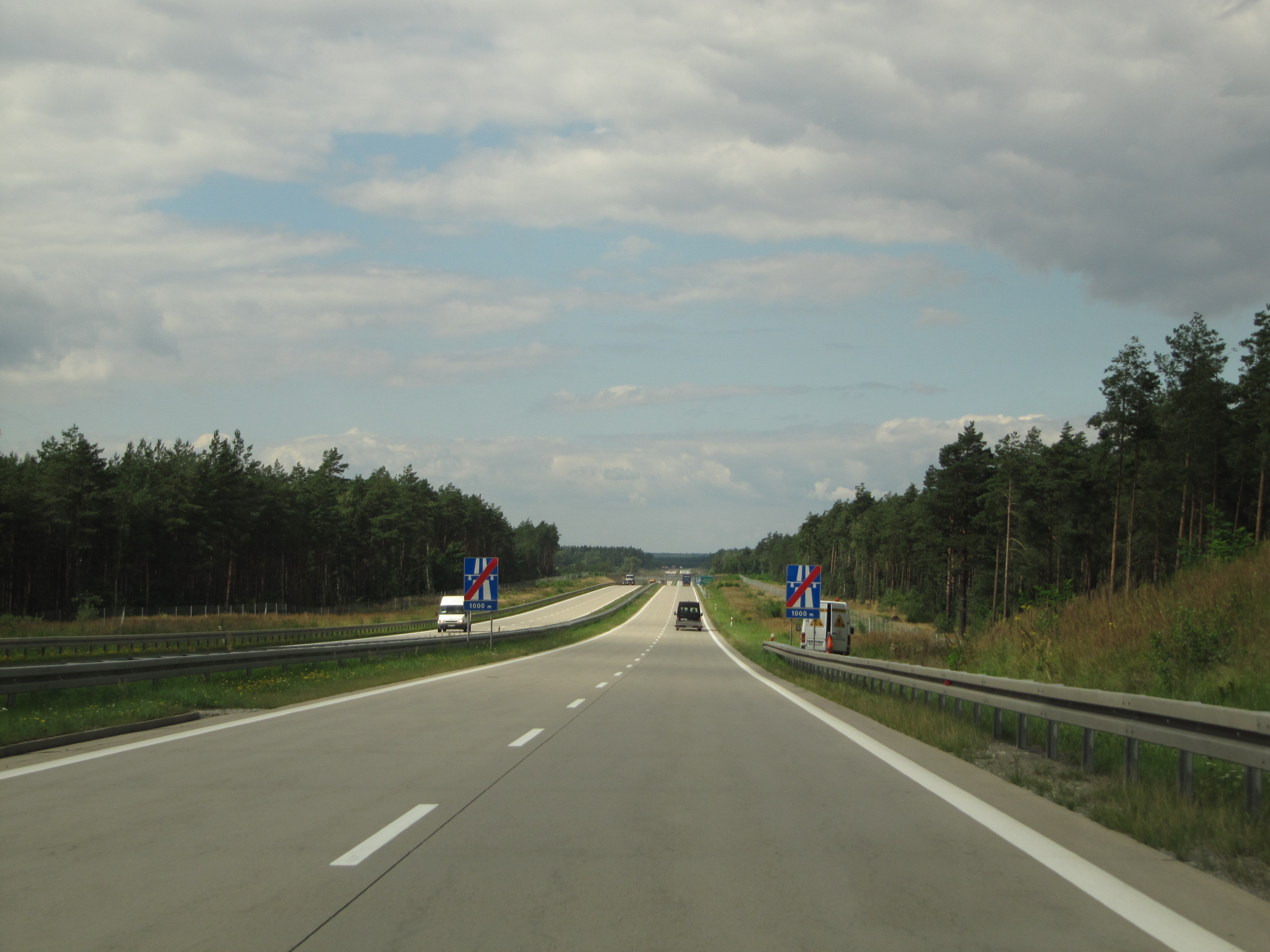
After reconstruction, the whole A18 has new high-quality surface, however a short (5.6 km) fragment remains substandard due to lack of emergency lanes.

=== The 1930s (the southern carriageway) ===
The motorway had its beginning as a single-carriageway part of Reichsautobahn 9 (Berlin-Breslau) built by Nazi Germany in the 1930s, completed between 1936 and 1938. This route had all the features of an autobahn, built according to the standards of the time, including all the exits, viaducts and bridges. However, only a single carriageway was constructed along most of its length and space was left for constructing the second carriageway at a later time.

The road existed in this state until the early 1990s, when the first 17 km (11 mi) at its eastern end was rebuilt with new concrete carriageways and first signed A18 (later, in 2009, the section signed as A18 was shortened to 7 km, while the rest was re-signed as A4 when the connecting stretch of that motorway was opened). In 1995, a new stretch of the second carriageway was constructed on the section near the border crossing (7 km).

=== 2004 – 2006 (the northern carriageway) ===
Between 2004 and 2006, the northern carriageway was constructed in the allocated space reserve and most of the overpasses and bridges were reconstructed. By June 2007, the road had two carriageways in use, but the older of the two (carrying eastbound traffic towards Wrocław) was in extremely poor shape, still using the surface made of concrete slabs laid in the 1930s. Due to bad road condition, the speed on that carriageway was limited to 70 km/h.

Reconstruction of the southern carriageway was originally intended to proceed shortly afterwards, but did not start due to delays caused, in part, by changes in the motorway project required by new environmental protection rules (A18 passes through Natura 2000 protected areas). On 15 July 2010, the environmental decision for the revised project was issued, which would have allowed for the contract bidding procedure to be completed and for construction to start in 2011. However, in December 2010, the Polish government announced significant cutbacks to its funding for road construction, which delayed the project. In 2014, when the National Program of Road Construction for 2014 – 2023 was created, the government did not envisage it starting in the near future.

=== 2020 – 2023 (reconstruction of the southern carriageway) ===
In 2018, the ministry amended the National Program of Road Construction for 2014 – 2023 by including reconstruction of A18 on the primary list.

The reconstruction started in 2020 and 2021. The 1930s carriageway got closed on the whole length and the traffic in both directions was moved onto the high quality northern carriageway. The reconstruction was finished in October 2023, and the full length was then officially designated as an Autostrada.

== Exits ==
Country	Voivodeship	Location	km	mi	Exit	Name	Destinations	Notes
Poland	Lubusz Voivodeship	Olszyna, Lubusz Voivodeship	0	0.0	—	Germany–Poland border	A 15 / E36 – Berlin	• Terminus of A18; road continues as Bundesautobahn 15 towards Berlin • North-west end of E 36 overlap
Poland	Lubusz Voivodeship	Olszyna, Lubusz Voivodeship	1	0.62	—	Olszyna	local road – Trzebiel	
Poland	Lubusz Voivodeship	Królów	9.9	6.2	—	Żary Zachód	DK 12 – Łęknica / Żary	Rebuilding completed in September 2022.
Poland	Lubusz Voivodeship	Drozdów, Lubusz Voivodeship	25	16	—	Żary Południe	DK 27 – Przewóz / Zielona Góra	Rebuilding completed in September 2022.
Poland	Lubusz Voivodeship	Czerna, Żagań County	37.5	23.3	—	Iłowa	DW 296 – Lubań / Żagań	
Poland	Lower Silesian Voivodeship	Luboszów	54	34	—	Luboszów	local road – Lubań / Świętoszów	
Poland	Lower Silesian Voivodeship	Golnice	70.7	43.9	—	Golnice	DW 297 – Nowa Sól / Bolesławiec, Jelenia Góra	
Poland	Lower Silesian Voivodeship	Golnice			—			
Poland	Lower Silesian Voivodeship	Krzyżowa, Bolesławiec County	75.5	46.9	—	Krzyżowa interchange	A 4 / E40 – Wrocław / Jędrzychowice, Zgorzelec, Dresden	South-east end of E 36 overlap
1.000 mi = 1.609 km; 1.000 km = 0.621 mi: Concurrency terminus; Incomplete access; Route transition

== See also ==
- Highways in Poland
- European route E36
