= Grodkowice =

- Village
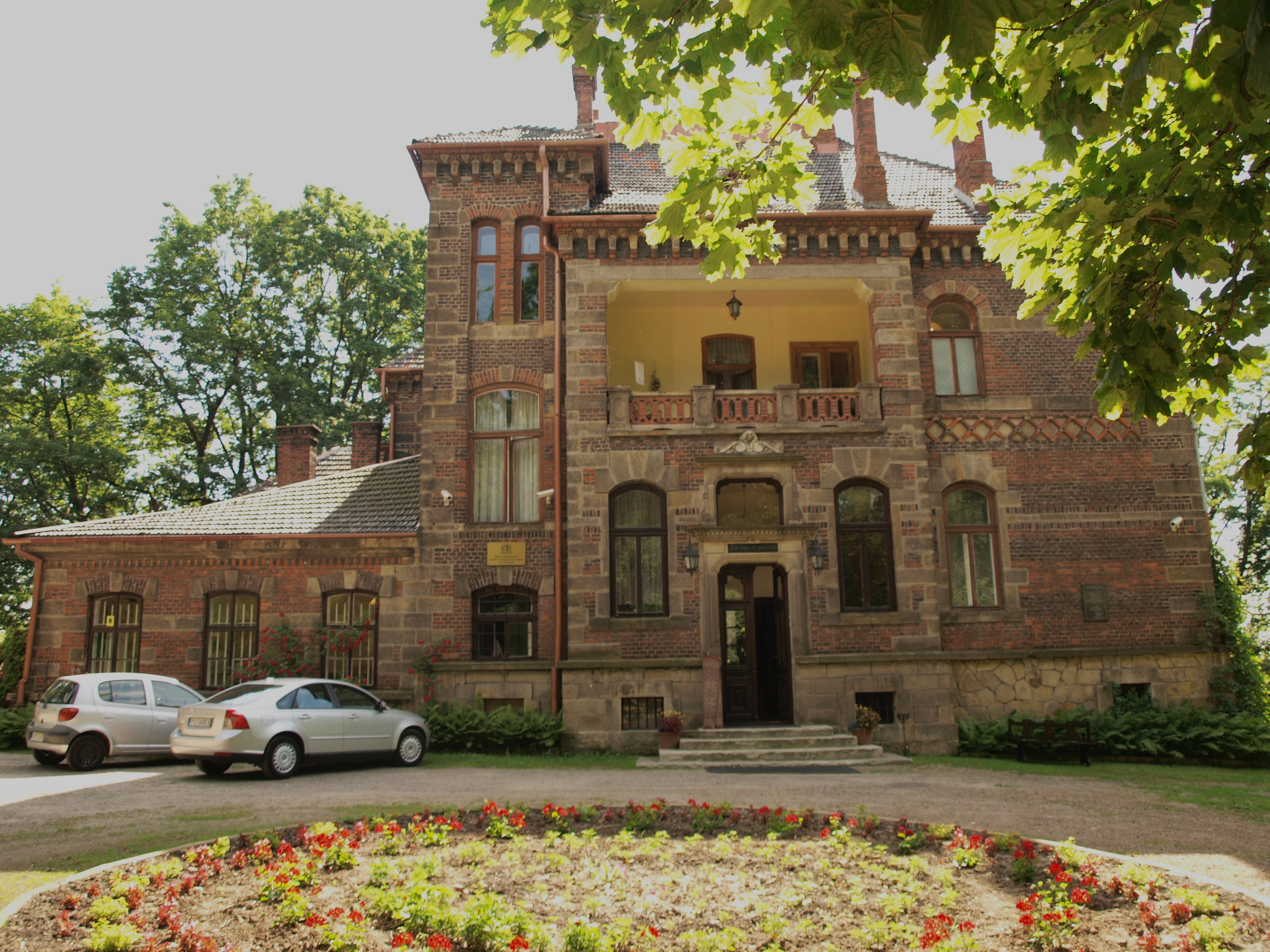
- Żeleński family manor

- Location within Poland
- Coordinates: 49°59′N 20°16′E
- Country: Poland
- Voivodeship: Lesser Poland
- County: Wieliczka
- Gmina: Kłaj
- Elevation: 120 m (390 ft)
- Population: 390

Grodkowice [ɡrɔtkɔˈvit͡sɛ] is a village in the administrative district of Gmina Kłaj, within Wieliczka County, Lesser Poland Voivodeship, in southern Poland.
