= Bundesautobahn 15 =

Federal motorway in Germany

A 15
- Bundesautobahn 15

Route information
- Part of E36
- Length: 64 km (40 mi)

Major junctions
- West end: A 13 in Lübbenau
- East end: Forst; A18 border with Poland

Location
- Country: Germany
- States: Brandenburg

Highway system
- Roads in Germany; Autobahns; List; Federal; List; State; E-roads
| ← A 14 | → A 17 |

Bundesautobahn 15 (translates from German as Federal Motorway 15, short form Autobahn 15, abbreviated as BAB 15 or A 15) is an autobahn in eastern Germany. It is one of the original Reichsautobahns and connected Breslau to Berlin, via Wrocław (Breslau) and Görlitz. It connects Germany and Poland. A 15 is part of European route E36.

== History ==
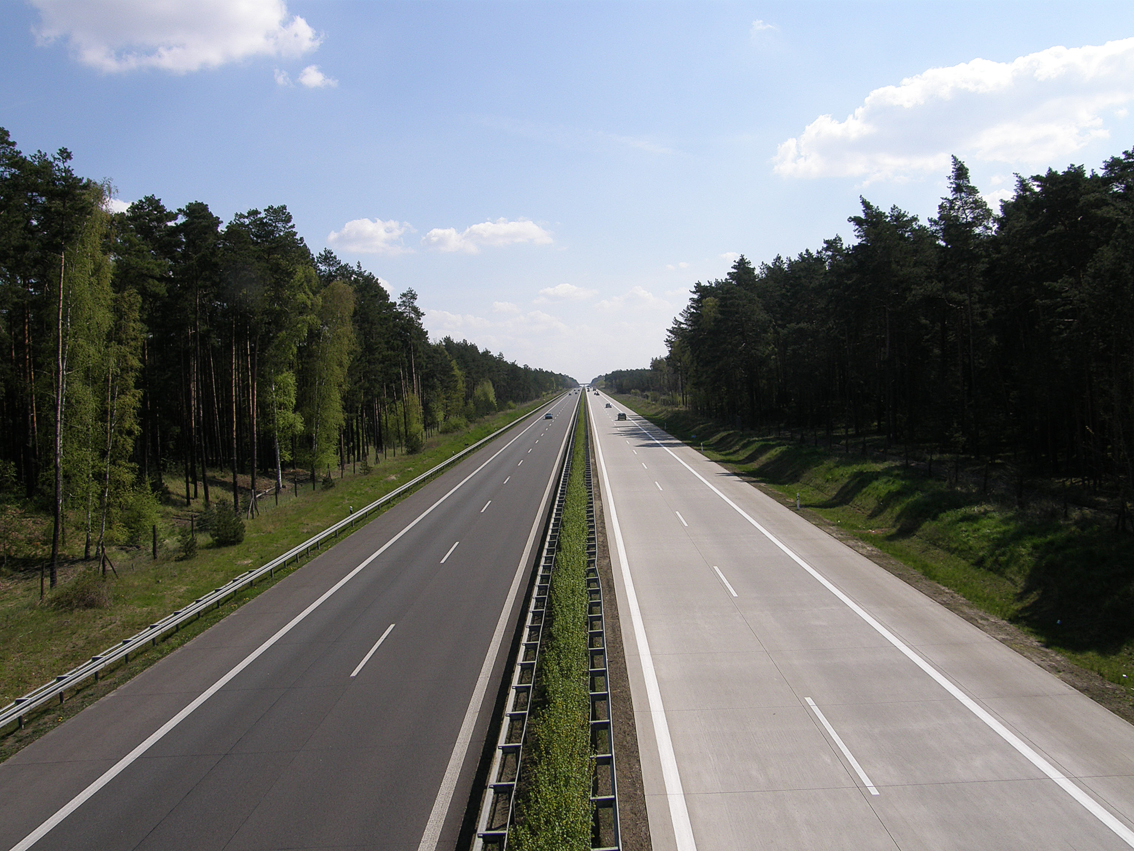
A 15 near Kolkwitz

The A 15 was initially planned as a Reichsautobahn Berlin - Wrocław - Upper Silesia, and was completed until the beginning of the war, one lane to Wrocław. Until the reunification, only a few lanes (south side) to a few hundred metres as the three-way junction (Dreieck) Spreewald. In the GDR, the highway was internally named A 5. As a peculiarity of the route, many bridges are destroyed in World War II; these were restored under the GDR. The Spreebrücke near the junction of South Cottbus, was restored in the northern side. In this area, the road was then pivoted. The Spreewald junction was completed in 1962. Until then, the traffic to and from the A 13 in the direction of Berlin, crossed in the opposite direction on the ramps (as there were no bridges). During the 1990s, the north side of the highway was gradually built. The first completed section was three kilometres from the triangle Spreewald. In the course of construction work, the traffic had to be regulated by traffic light. Before the reunification, at the AVUS in Berlin (West), was gradually named A 15. After the reunification, it was renumbered A 115.

During the construction work on the 8 April 2016, an apparent bomb from the World War II was initially discovered. In an abundance of caution, the A 15 was cordoned off from both sides. It turned out it was not a bomb, but a metal pipe.

== Exit list ==
| (1) | Spreewald 3-way interchange A 13 E36 E55 |
| (2) | Boblitz |
| (3) | Vetschau/Spreewald B 115 |
| (4) | Cottbus-West B 169 |
| (5) | Cottbus-Süd B 97 |
| | Spreebrücke |
| (6) | Roggosen B 115 |
| (7) | Forst |
| | Services Groß Bademeusel |
| (8) | Bademeusel B 122 |
| (9) | Bademeusel border crossing |
| E36 | Poland - A18 |
