= Łężkowice =

- Village
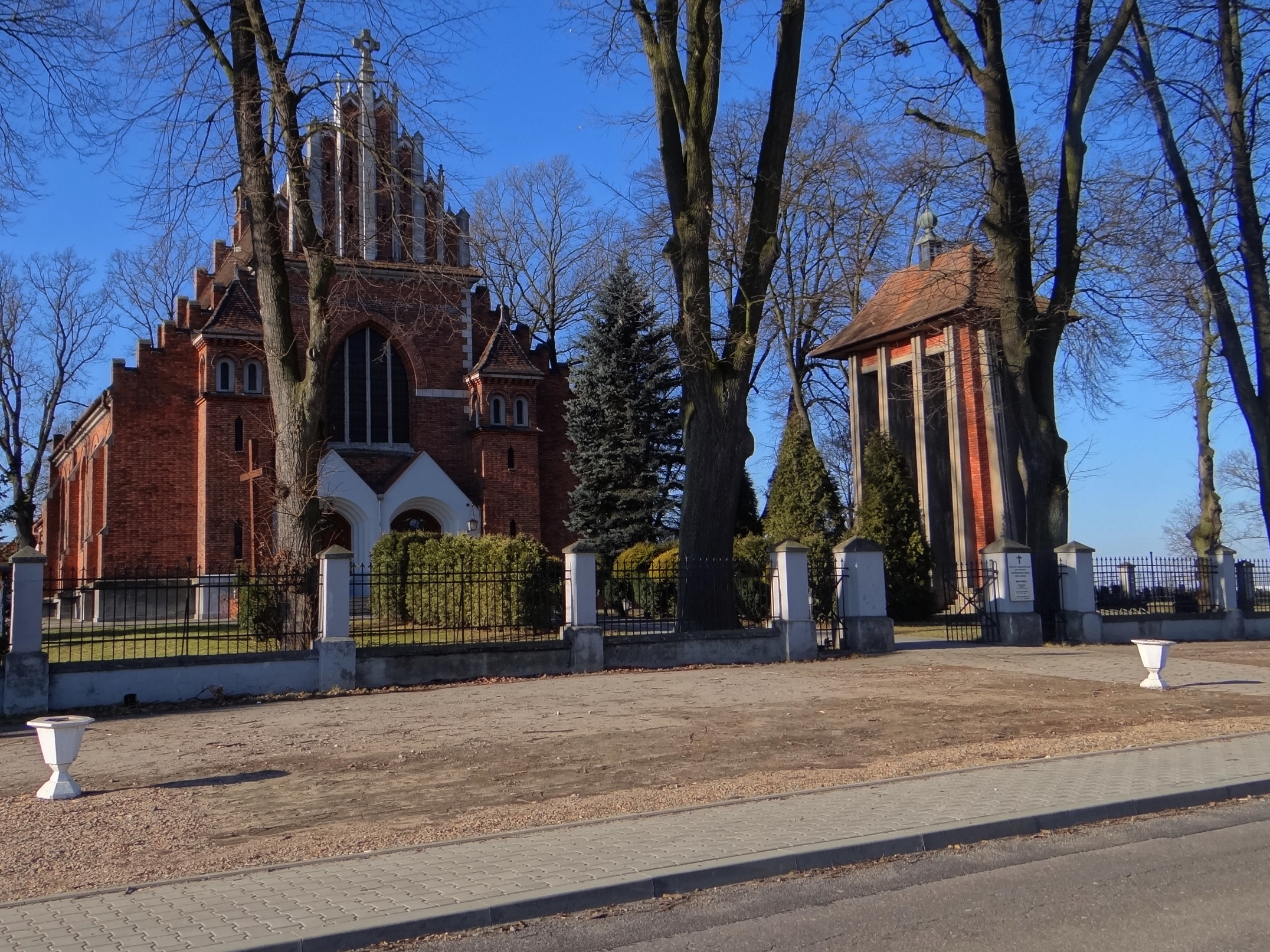
- Catholic church

- Location within Poland
- Coordinates: 49°57′N 20°17′E
- Country: Poland
- Voivodeship: Lesser Poland
- County: Wieliczka
- Gmina: Kłaj
- Population: 340

Łężkowice [wɛ̃ʂkɔˈvit͡sɛ] is a village in the administrative district of Gmina Kłaj, within Wieliczka County, Lesser Poland Voivodeship, in southern Poland.
