= Julius Roger =

German entomologist

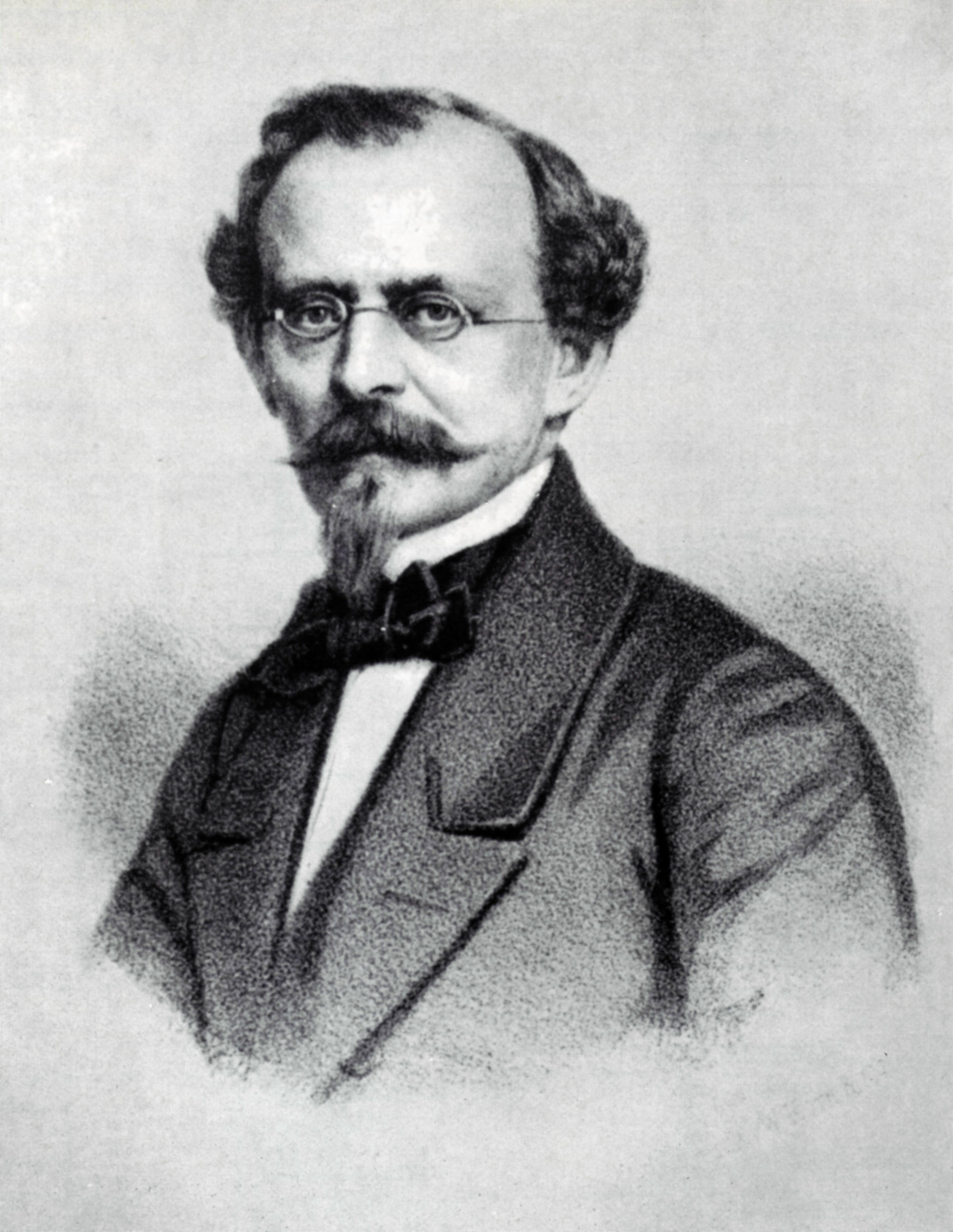
- Doctor Julius Roger
- Born: 23 February 1819; Niederstotzingen, Germany
- Died: 7 January 1865 (aged 45); Rachowitz, Upper Silesia
- Known for: building hospitals in Silesia identifying over 400 new insect species collecting folk songs
- Scientific career
- Fields: hospitals; entomology; folklore

Julius Roger (23 February 1819 – 7 January 1865) was a German medical doctor, entomologist, and folklorist who worked in Ratibor, in Upper Silesia, most notable for having arranged (and raised the necessary monies) to build hospitals in Groß Rauden, Pilchowitz, and the current public hospital in Rybnik.

He is also notable for collaborating with entomologist Ernst Gustav Kraatz, contributing to Kraatz's founding of the German Entomological Institute collections; for identifying and discovering over 400 new species of beetles and other insects; and for collecting folk songs (a collection of 546 songs - huntsmens songs, pastoral and farmers songs, Gypsy songs, ballads, and love songs).

His zoological author abbreviation is Roger.

== See also ==
- Taxa authored by Julius Roger
