= Dąbrowa, Wieliczka County =

Dąbrowa
- Village
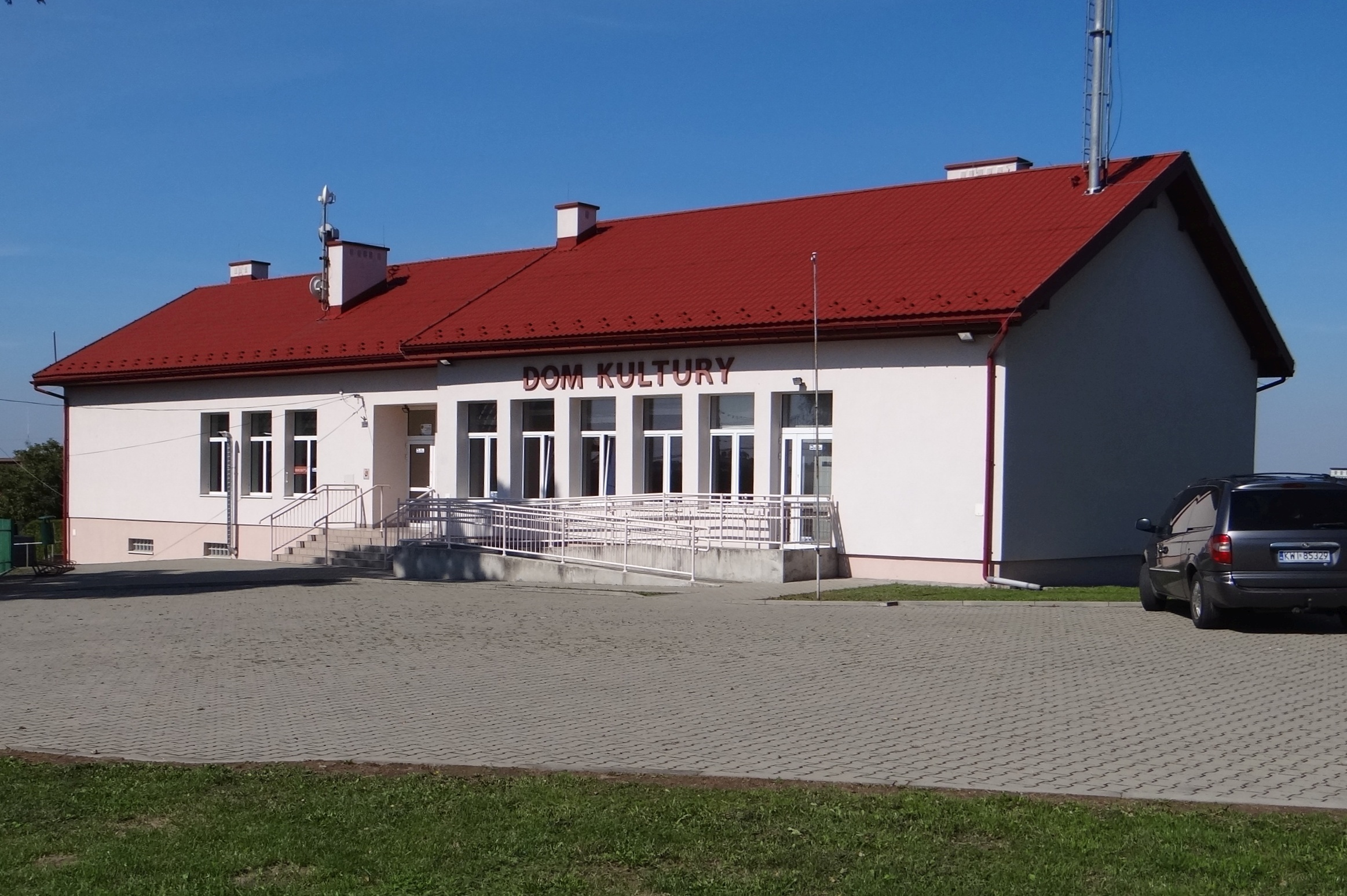

- Location within Poland
- Coordinates: 50°0′15″N 20°15′5″E
- Country: Poland
- Voivodeship: Lesser Poland
- County: Wieliczka
- Gmina: Kłaj
- Population: 990

Dąbrowa [dɔmˈbrɔva] is a village in the administrative district of Gmina Kłaj, within Wieliczka County, Lesser Poland Voivodeship, in southern Poland.
