= Gruszki, Lesser Poland Voivodeship =

Gruszki
- Village
- Location within Poland
- Coordinates: 49°59′50″N 20°13′32″E
- Country: Poland
- Voivodeship: Lesser Poland
- County: Wieliczka
- Gmina: Kłaj
- Population: 450
- Website: http://www.gruszki.go.pl/

Gruszki [ˈɡruʂki] is a village in the administrative district of Gmina Kłaj, within Wieliczka County, Lesser Poland Voivodeship, in southern Poland.
