= Brzezie, Wieliczka County =

Brzezie
- Village
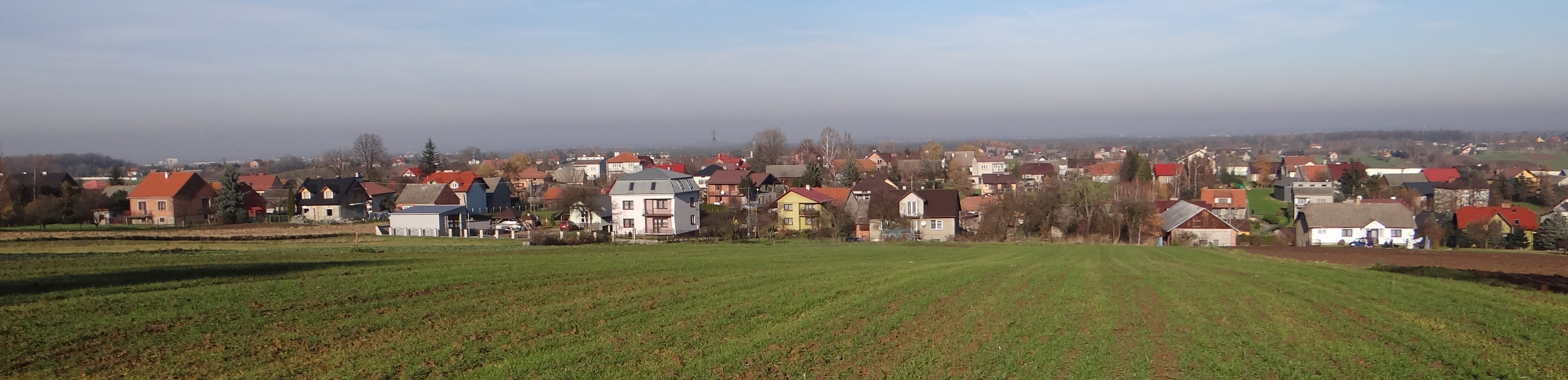

- Location within Poland
- Coordinates: 49°59′N 20°13′E
- Country: Poland
- Voivodeship: Lesser Poland
- County: Wieliczka
- Gmina: Kłaj
- Population: 1,000

Brzezie [ˈbʐɛʑɛ] is a village in the administrative district of Gmina Kłaj, within Wieliczka County, Lesser Poland Voivodeship, in southern Poland.
