= Olszyna, Lubusz Voivodeship =

Olszyna
- Village
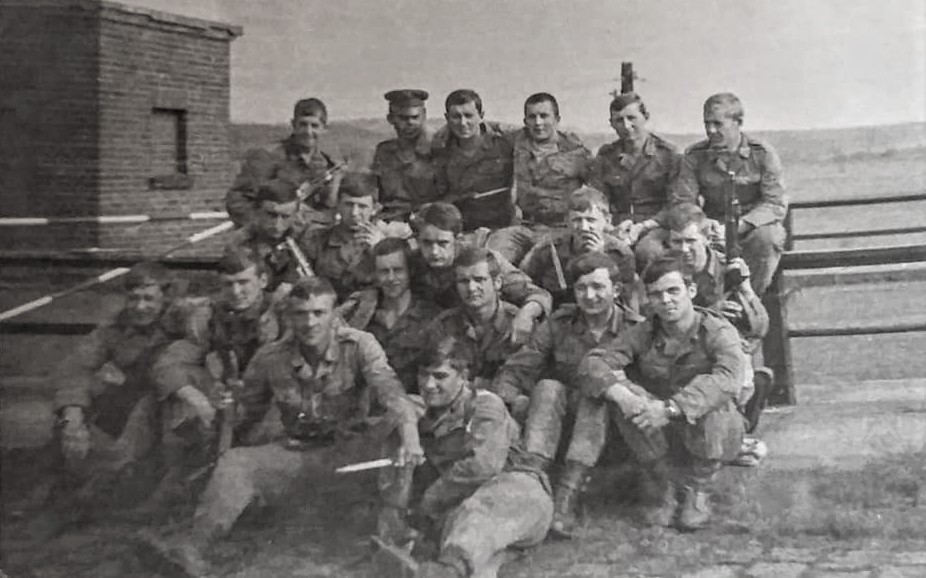
- Polish Border Protection Troops in Olszyna in 1969

- Location within Poland
- Coordinates: 51°39′N 14°46′E
- Country: Poland
- Voivodeship: Lubusz
- County: Żary
- Gmina: Trzebiel
- Time zone: UTC+1 (CET)
  - Summer (DST): UTC+2 (CEST)
- Vehicle registration: FZA

Olszyna [ɔlˈʂɨna] (Lower Sorbian: Olšyna) is a village in the administrative district of Gmina Trzebiel, within Żary County, Lubusz Voivodeship, in western Poland, close to the German border. It is the site of a major border crossing on the E36 motorway connecting Berlin, Germany with Wrocław and Kraków in Poland.

Since the Middle Ages, the village was at various times part of Poland, the Czech Crown Lands, and the Electorate of Saxony. In 1815, following the Congress of Vienna, it was annexed by the Kingdom of Prussia. From 1871 to 1945 it formed part of Germany. After the defeat of Nazi Germany in World War II, the village became again part of Poland.
