= Kleszczów, Silesian Voivodeship =

Kleszczów
- Village
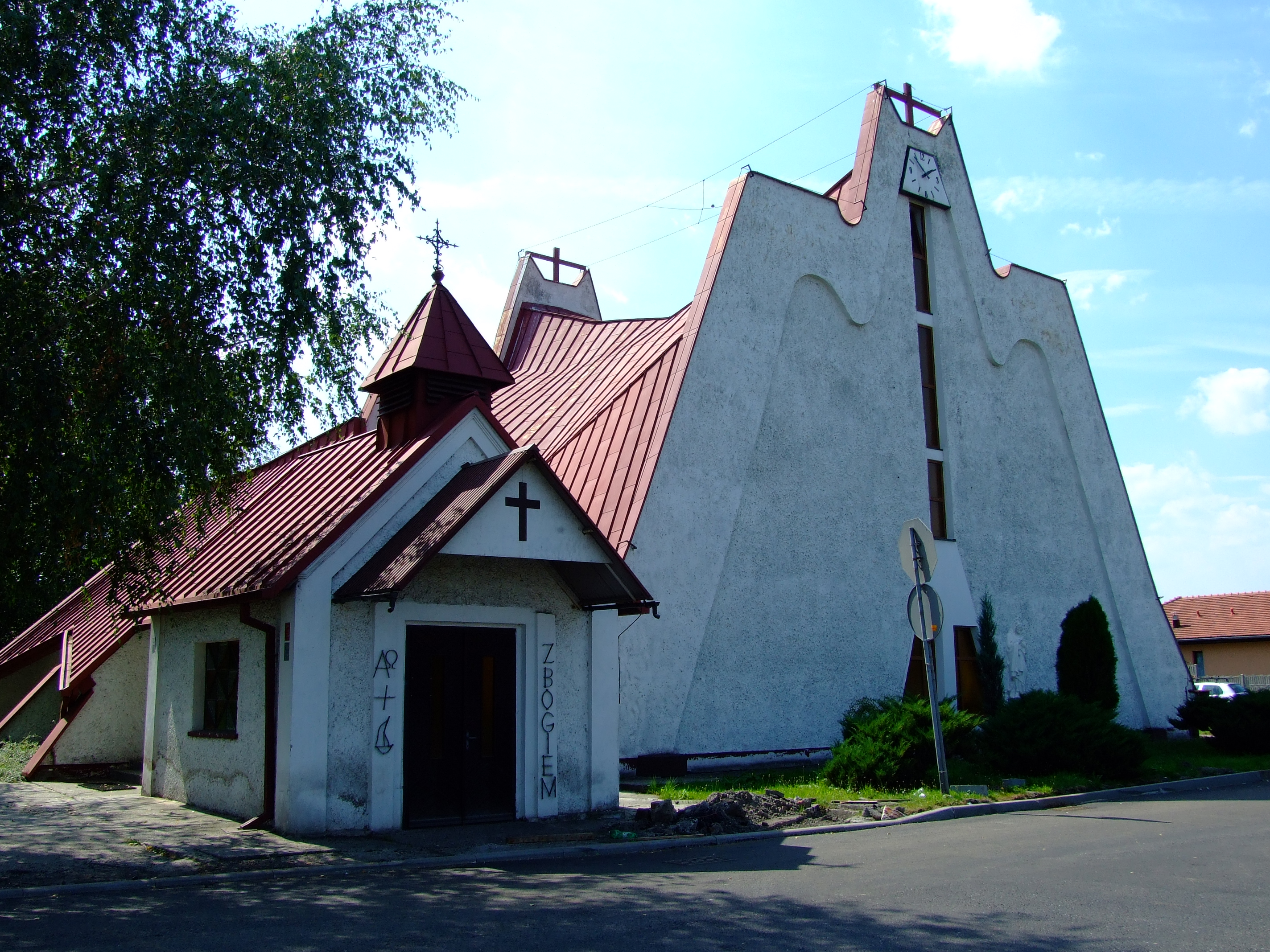
- Blessed Virgin Mary Church

- Location within Poland
- Coordinates: 50°20′N 18°31′E
- Country: Poland
- Voivodeship: Silesian
- County: Gliwice
- Gmina: Rudziniec

Government
  - Mayor: Helena Anita Derner
- Population: 781

Kleszczów [ˈklɛʂt͡ʂuf] is a village in the administrative district of Gmina Rudziniec, within Gliwice County, Silesian Voivodeship, in southern Poland.
