= Gmina Kłaj =

Gmina Kłaj Kłaj Commune
- Gmina
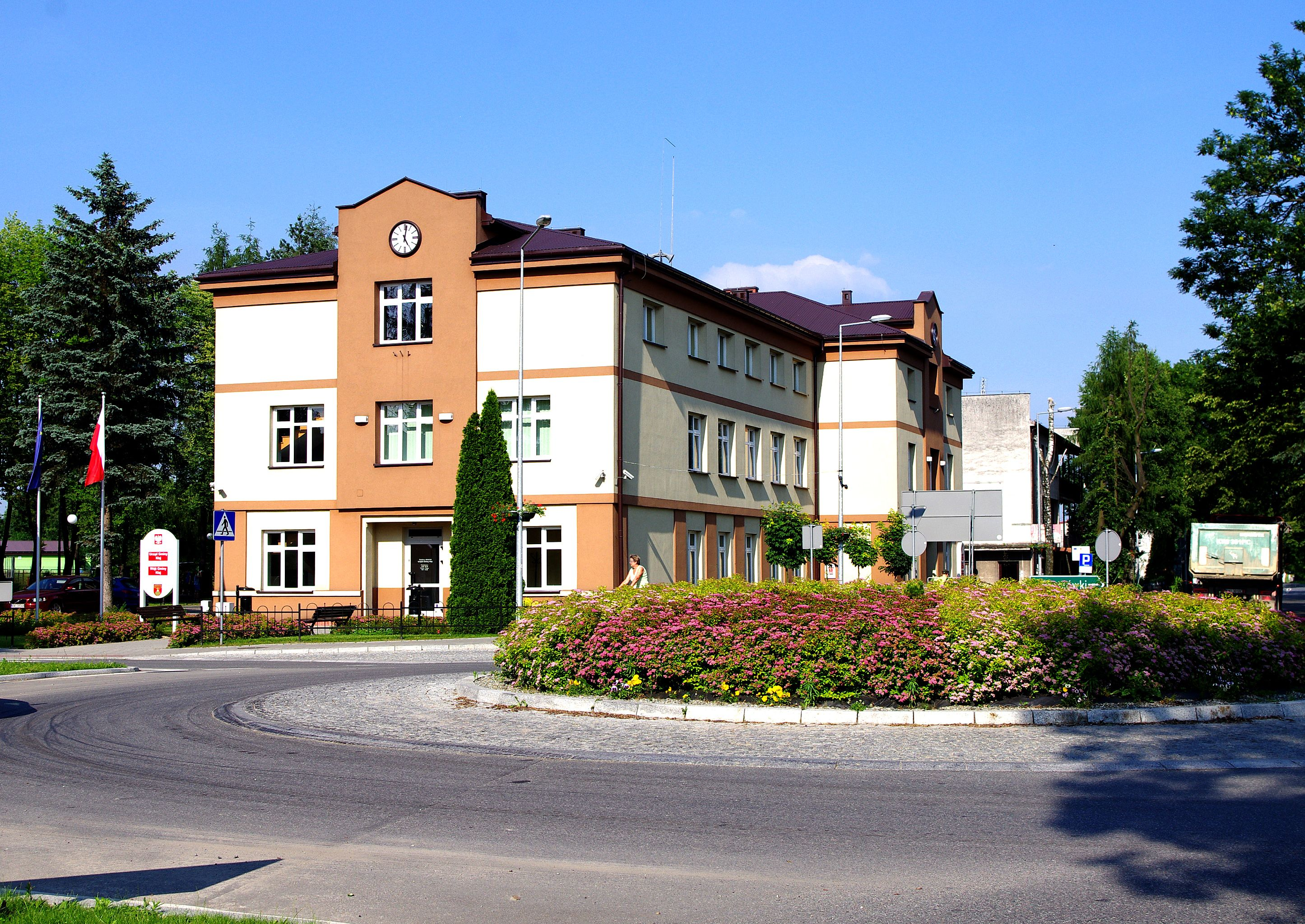

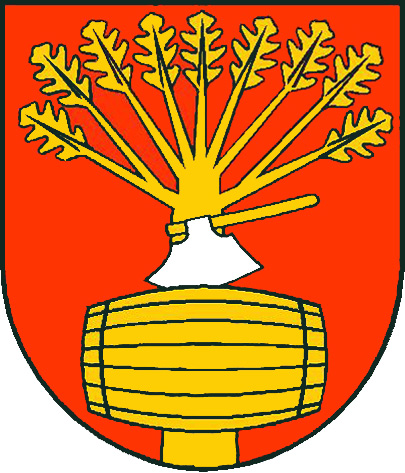
- Coat of arms
- Interactive map of Gmina Kłaj
- Coordinates (Kłaj): 49°59′N 20°18′E
- Country: Poland
- Voivodeship: Lesser Poland
- County: Wieliczka
- Seat: Kłaj

Area
  - Total: 83.1 km^{2} (32.1 sq mi)

Population (2006)
  - Total: 9,832
  - Density: 118/km^{2} (306/sq mi)
- Website: http://www.klaj.pl/

Gmina Kłaj is a rural gmina (administrative district) in Wieliczka County, Lesser Poland Voivodeship, in southern Poland. Its seat is the village of Kłaj, which lies approximately 17 kilometres (11 mi) east of Wieliczka and 28 km (17 mi) east of the regional capital Kraków.

The gmina covers an area of 83.1 square kilometres (32.1 sq mi), and as of 2006 its total population is 9,832.

== Villages ==
Gmina Kłaj contains the villages and settlements of Brzezie, Dąbrowa, Grodkowice, Gruszki, Kłaj, Łężkowice, Łysokanie, Szarów and Targowisko.

== Neighbouring gminas ==
Gmina Kłaj is bordered by the gminas of Bochnia, Drwinia, Niepołomice and Gdów.
