= Kłaj =

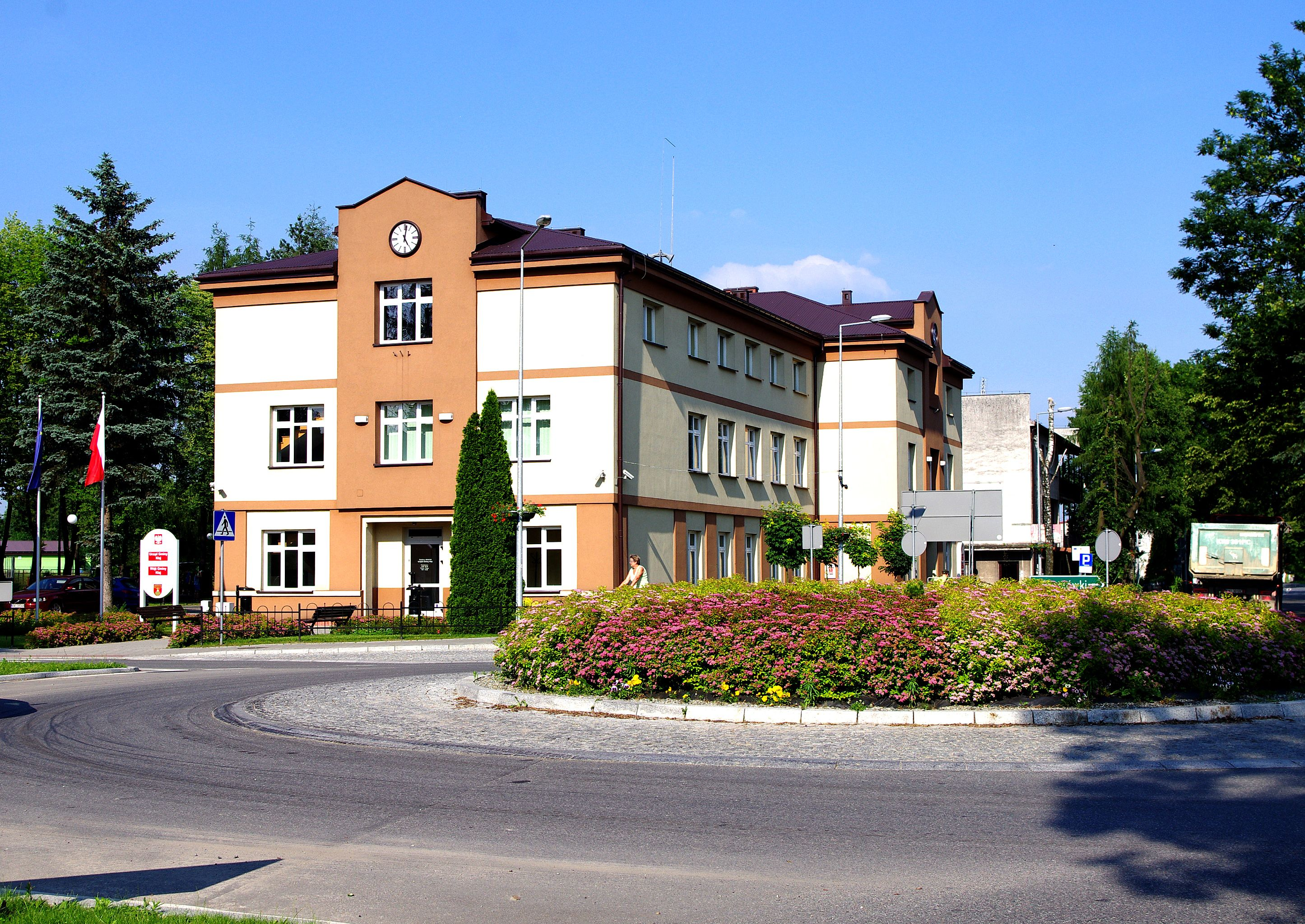

- Location within Poland
- Coordinates: 49°59′N 20°18′E
- Country: Poland
- Voivodeship: Lesser Poland
- County: Wieliczka
- Gmina: Kłaj

Population (2007)
  - Total: 3,200
- Time zone: UTC+1 (CET)
  - Summer (DST): UTC+2 (CEST)
- Postal code: 32-015
- Area code: +48 12
- Car plates: KWI

Kłaj [kwai̯] is a village of about 3,000 inhabitants in the Wieliczka County of Poland's Lesser Poland province.

Kłaj is the seat of government for the administrative district of Gmina Kłaj, on the road from Kraków to Bochnia, and not far from either. The village was founded in the 13th century.
