= Targowisko, Lesser Poland Voivodeship =

Targowisko
- Village
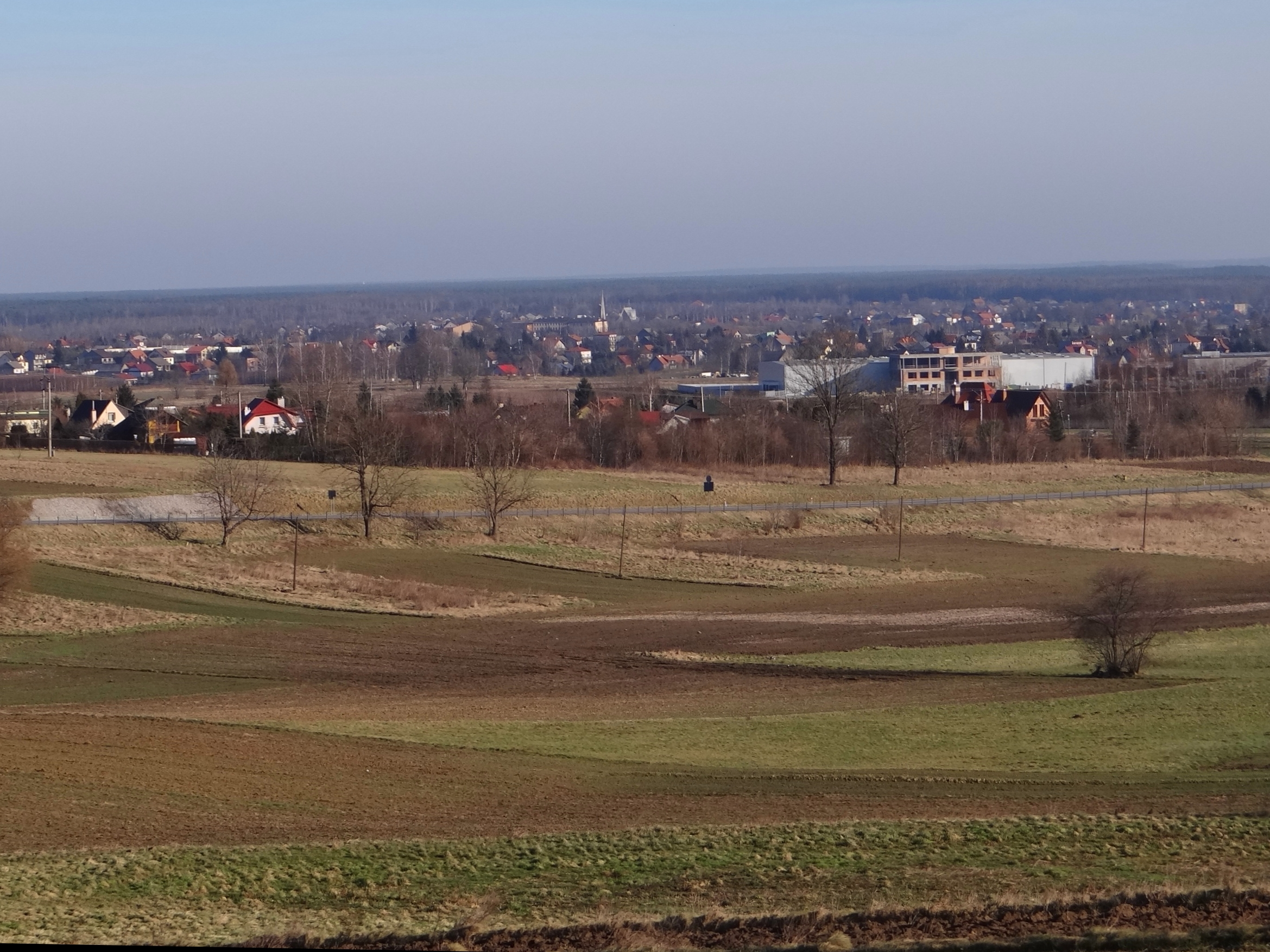

- Location within Poland
- Coordinates: 49°59′N 20°17′E
- Country: Poland
- Voivodeship: Lesser Poland
- County: Wieliczka
- Gmina: Kłaj
- Population: 1,670
- Website: http://www.klaj.pl/targ.html

Targowisko [tarɡɔˈviskɔ] is a village in the administrative district of Gmina Kłaj, within Wieliczka County, Lesser Poland Voivodeship, in southern Poland.
