= Szarów, Lesser Poland Voivodeship =

Szarów
- Village
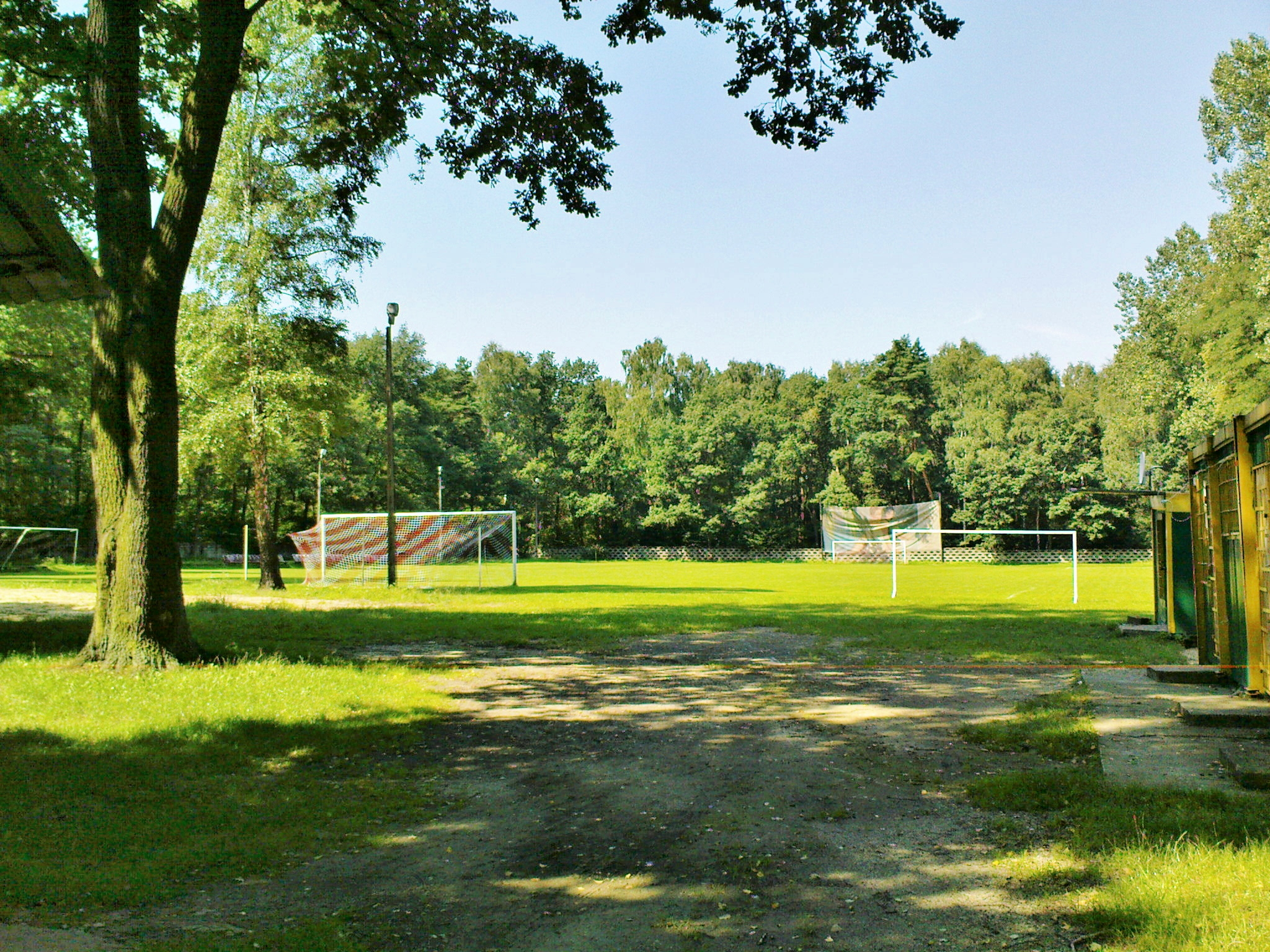
- LKS Zryw Szarów football field

- Location within Poland
- Coordinates: 49°59′43″N 20°16′8″E
- Country: Poland
- Voivodeship: Lesser Poland
- County: Wieliczka
- Gmina: Kłaj
- Population: 1,337
- Website: http://www.szarow.cba.pl

Szarów [ˈʂaruf] is a village in the administrative district of Gmina Kłaj, within Wieliczka County, Lesser Poland Voivodeship, in southern Poland.
