= Rachowice =

- Village
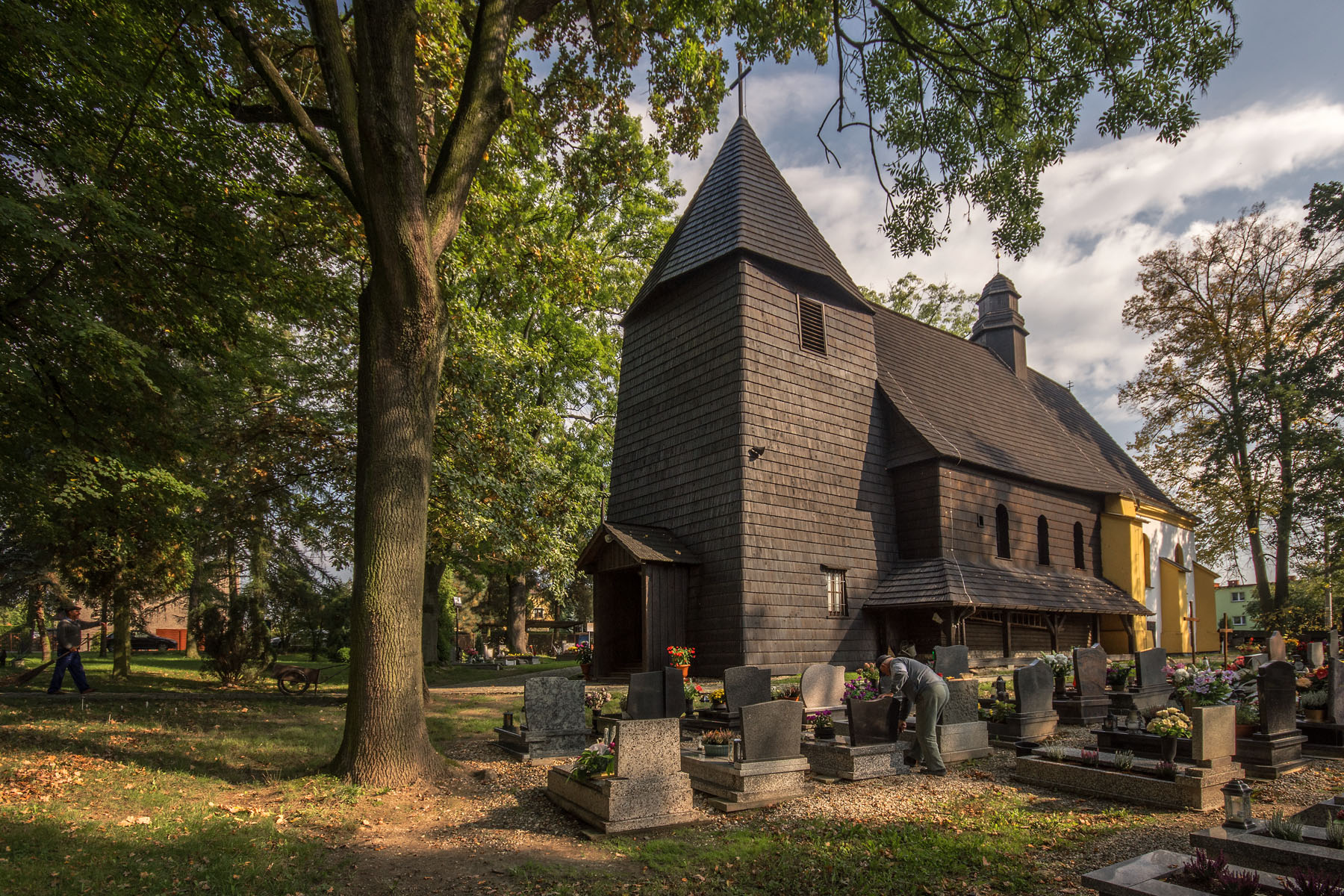
- Church of Holy Trinity

- Location within Poland
- Coordinates: 50°17′N 18°29′E
- Country: Poland
- Voivodeship: Silesian
- County: Gliwice
- Gmina: Sośnicowice
- Founded: 13th century

Population
  - Total: 699
- Time zone: UTC+1 (CET)
  - Summer (DST): UTC+2 (CEST)
- Vehicle registration: SGL

Rachowice [raxɔˈvit͡sɛ] is a village in the administrative district of Gmina Sośnicowice, within Gliwice County, Silesian Voivodeship, in southern Poland.

== Etymology ==
The name of the village is of Polish origin and comes from the word rak, which means "crayfish".

== History ==
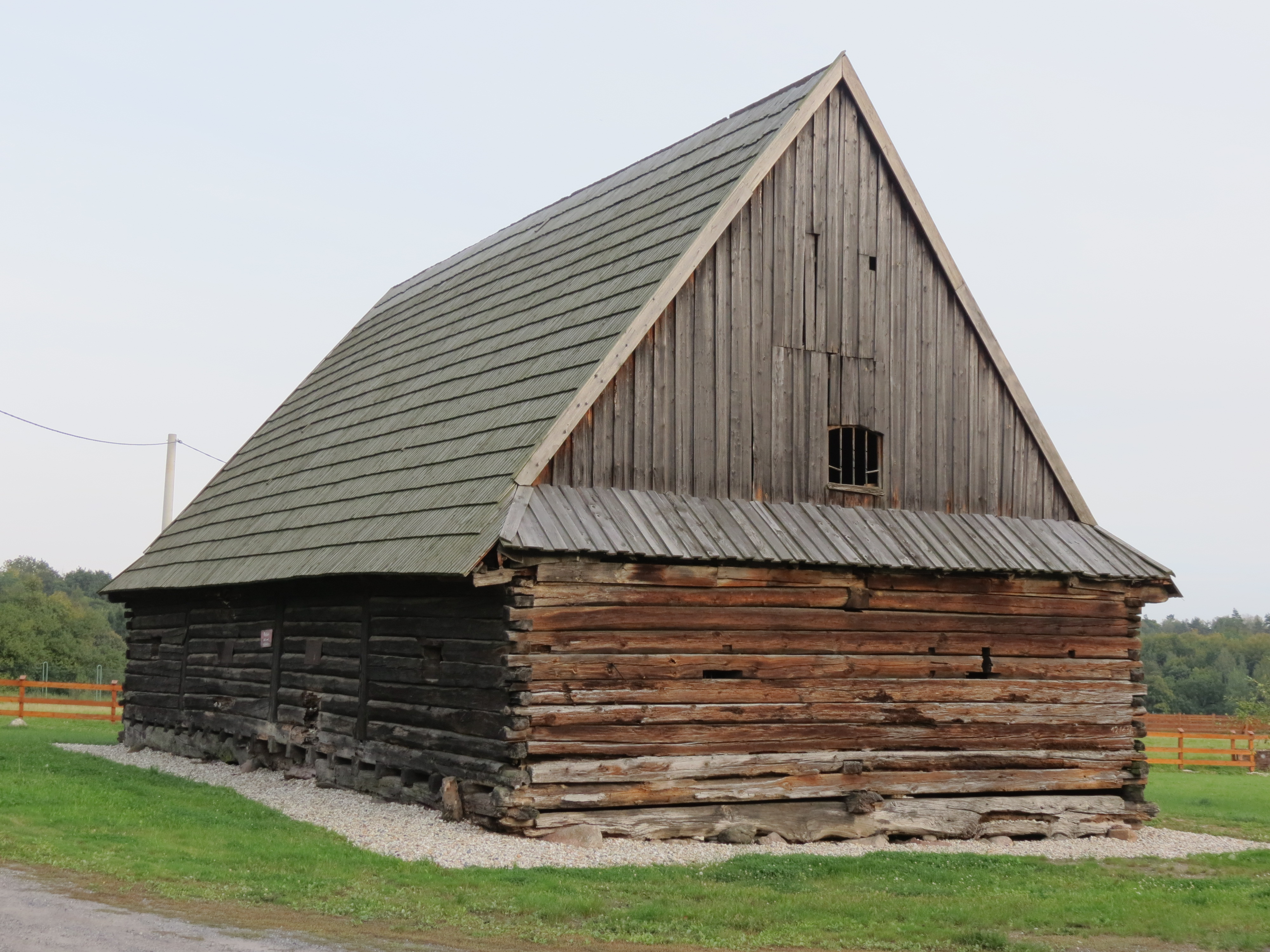
Preserved old granary

The village was founded in the 13th century within fragmented Piast-ruled Poland. Later on, it fell to Bohemia (Czechia) and Prussia. In 1861, it had a population of 645. In 1871, it became part of the German Empire. In the 1921 Upper Silesia plebiscite, 69.5% of the residents voted to rejoin Poland, which just regained independence following World War I, however the village remained within Germany in the interbellum. In 1936, during a massive Nazi campaign of renaming of placenames, the village was renamed to Buchenlust to erase traces of Polish origin.

During World War II, the Germans operated the E149 forced labour subcamp of the Stalag VIII-B/344 prisoner-of-war camp in the village. British prisoners of war were engaged in forestry work. In January 1945 the prisoners of war were evacuated on foot, in extreme winter weather conditions, and had to march for four months in a generally westward direction, until liberated by Allied forces. Following the war, in 1945, the village became again part of Poland and its historic name was restored.
