= Expressway S2 (Poland) =

Southern Bypass of Warsaw in the Polish highway system

Expressway S2
- Droga ekspresowa S2

Route information
- Part of E30
- Maintained by GDDKiA
- Length: 34.1 km (21.2 mi)

Major junctions
- From: A2 west of Warsaw
- S8 SW of Warsaw S79 near Warsaw Frederic Chopin Airport; S7 near Warsaw Frederic Chopin Airport S17 east of Warsaw _{(under construction)}
- To: A2 east of Warsaw

Location
- Country: Poland
- Major cities: Warsaw

Highway system
- National roads in Poland; Voivodeship roads
← S 1	→ S 3

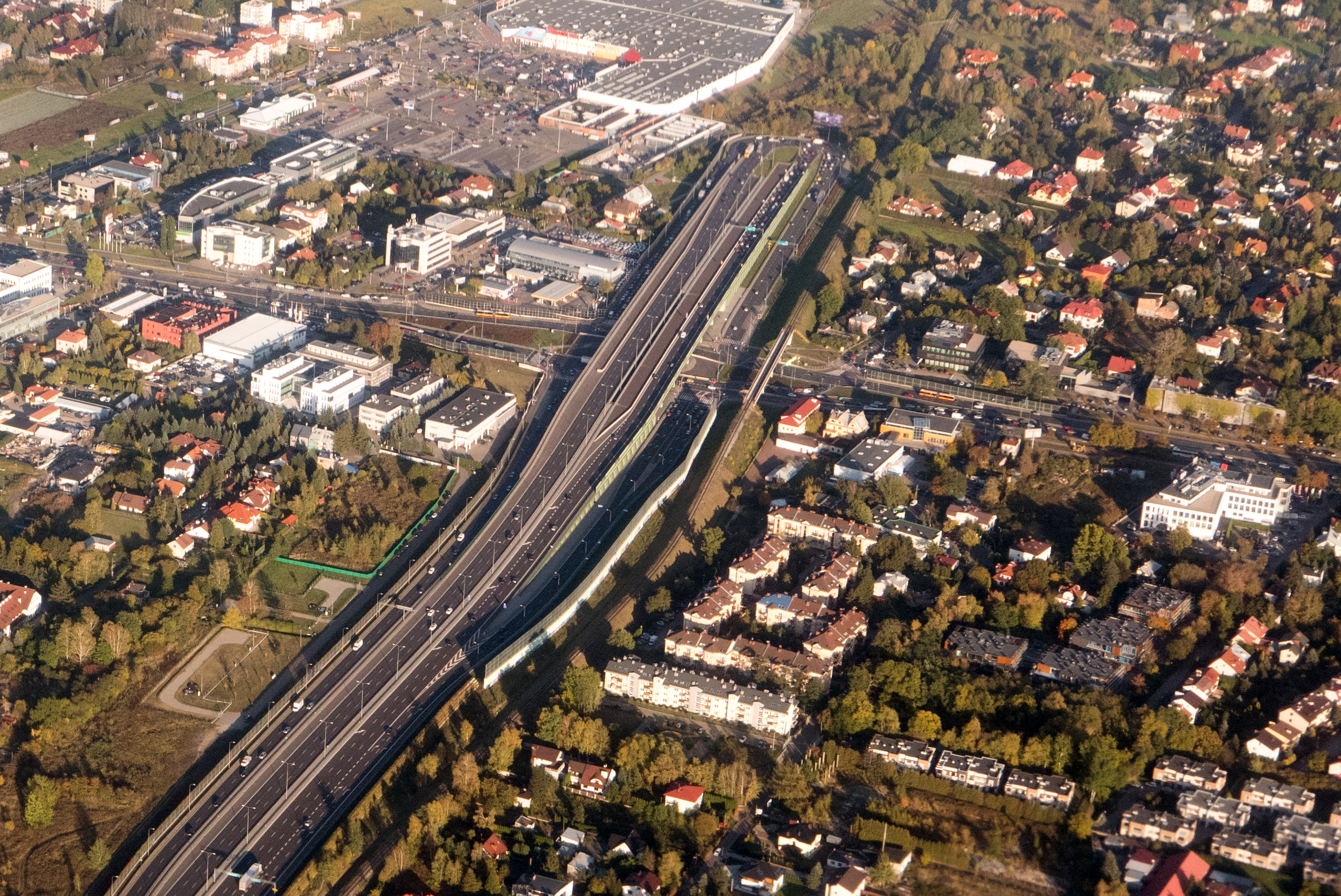
Puławska Exit in 2016 before the construction of the Ursynów tunnel

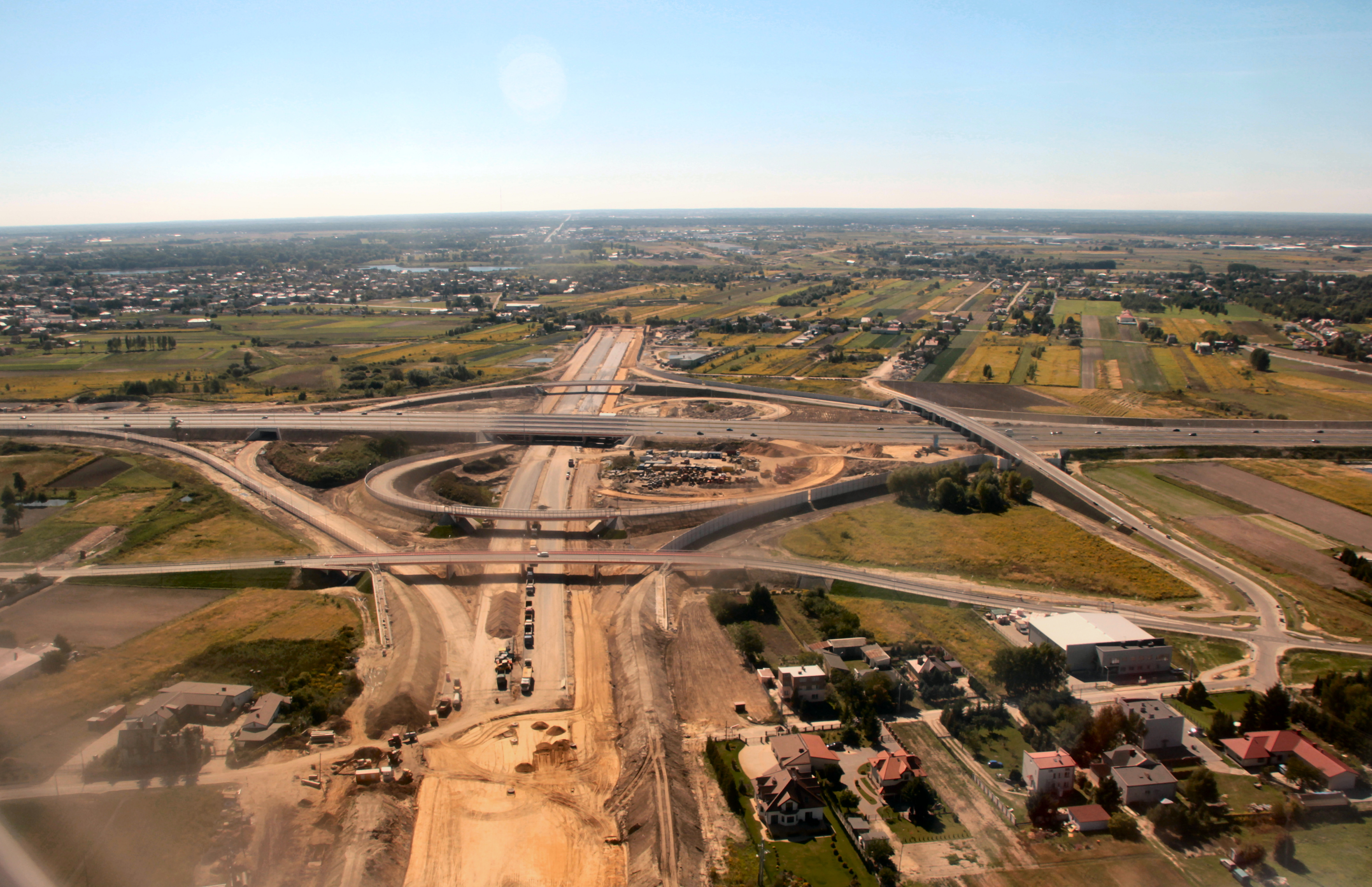
The S2 south of Warsaw-Okecie Airport, Interchange "Opacz", view on S7 in Kraków direction, September 2013

Expressway S2 is a short highway in Poland, serving as the southern section of the (partially completed) Warsaw Express Ring Road. Conceptually forming one continuous route with motorway A2, it was initially planned (since 1970s) as a part of it, however after local Warsaw residents objected to the plans of an inner-city motorway, the proposed road was downgraded to an expressway (though the actual route was not changed). The western half of the road was opened to traffic in 2013, while the eastern half was opened in 2020 and 2021.

== Chronology ==
Construction of the first phase of the project was divided into two sections. Work on a 3.9 km stretch between Warszawa Lotnisko junction (linking to expressway S79) and Puławska junction at the eastern end of this phase of the project began in September 2009, while construction of the other, 11.1 km long section between the western Konotopa junction (linking the motorway A2 and the western portion of the ring road, expressway S8) and Warszawa Lotnisko junction, began in the Summer of 2010.

Both sections were scheduled to be completed in mid 2012 in time for the Euro 2012 football championships, however this deadline was not met. The S2 Expressway was eventually opened in a number of stages, beginning in the west at Konotopa junction in August 2013, with further sections opening in September 2013, linking the road with expressway S79 leading to Warsaw Chopin Airport. The final part of this phase of the project up to Puławska junction was opened in late September 2013.

The second phase of the project took the expressway S2 east of Puławska across the Vistula river, through the Anna Jagiellon Bridge, connecting the route with the eastern part of the Warsaw Express Ring Road and the continuation of the motorway A2 eastwards. The design-and-build tender for this section (divided into 3 separate contracts) was announced on December 18, 2013, with completion date specified as 41 months from the date contract is signed (not counting 3 winter months). The contract was signed in December 2015, with completion planned for December 2020. The final section including the Ursynów Tunnel opened on 20 December 2021.

The contracts were:

- Contract A (4.6 km) including tunnel under Ursynów : Astaldi S.p.A., price about 1 222 mln zł.
- Contract B (6.45 km) including a bridge over the Vistula river: Gülermak Ağır Sanayi İnşaat ve Taahhüt A.S. and PBDiM Mińsk Maz., price about 757.6 mln zł.
- Contract C (7.45 km) including overpasses in Masovian Landscape Park: Warbud S.A. price about 561.7 mln zł.
- Oversight: Egis Polska Inżynieria Sp. z o.o., price about 53.4 mln zł.

=== Future developments ===
From 2025, on the section between Wilanow and Lubelska junctions, average speed measurement devices will be installed to reduce noise pollution.

== Ursynów tunnel ==
Expressway S2
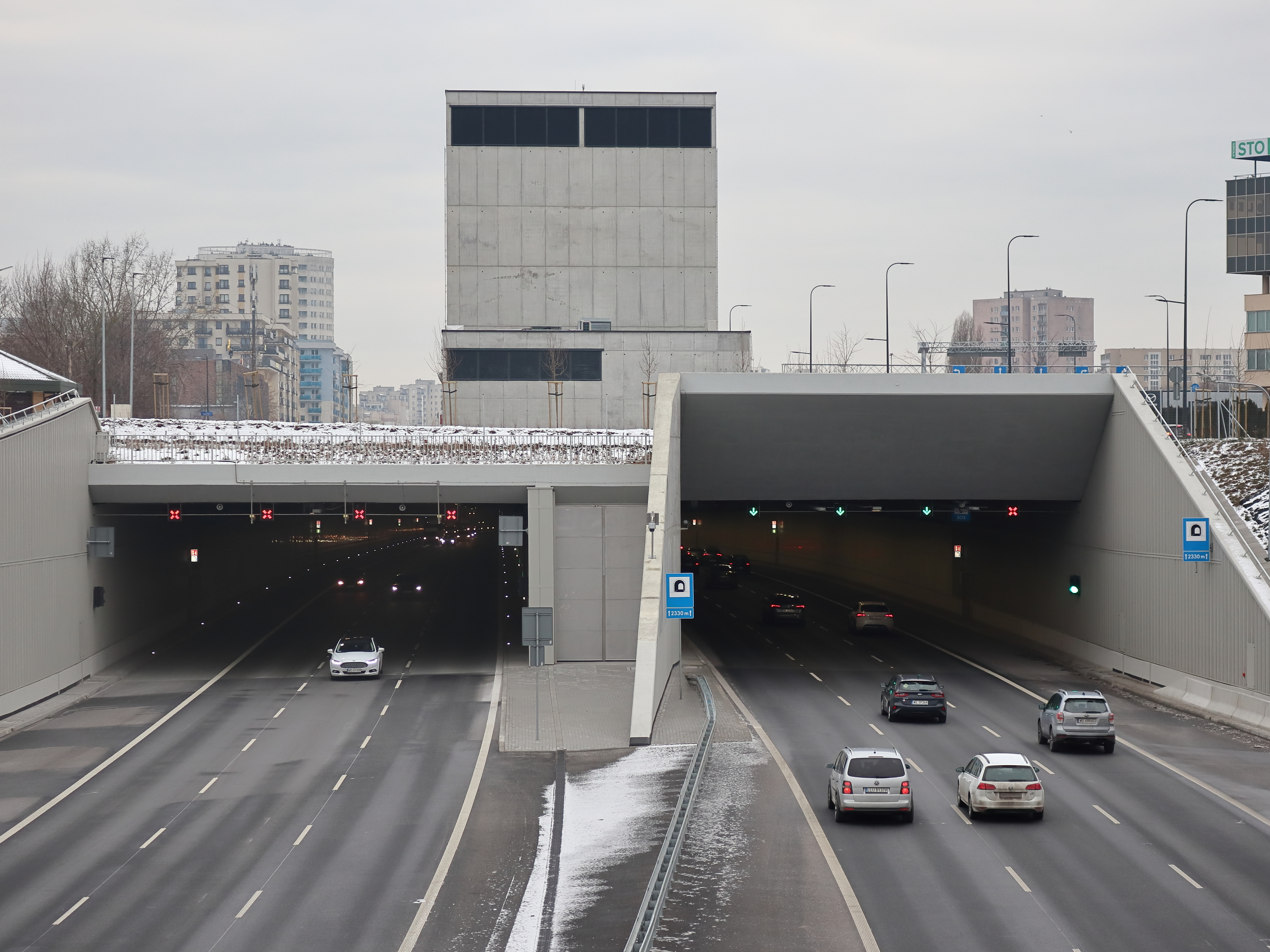
- Eastern portal of the tunnel in January 2022
- Interactive map of Expressway S2

Overview
- Official name: Tunel drogi ekspresowej S2 w Warszawie
- Location: Warsaw, Masovian Voivodeship, Poland
- Coordinates: 52°08′43″N 21°03′06″E
- Status: Completed
- Route: S 2
- Start: Węzeł Ursynów Zachód, Warsaw
- End: Węzeł Ursynów Wschód, Warsaw

Operation
- Work began: 1 March 2017
- Opened: 20 December 2021
- Operator: GDDKiA
- Traffic: car, minibus, van
- Character: Underground
- Toll: no

Technical
- Length: 2.33 km (1.45 mi) or 2.335 km (1.451 mi)
- No. of lanes: 6
- Operating speed: 80 kilometres per hour (50 mph)

The Expressway S2 Tunnel (Polish: Tunel drogi ekspresowej S2) or Ursynów Tunnel (Polish: Tunel pod Ursynowem) is a part of the S2 expressway in Warsaw. The tunnel began construction on 1 March 2017 and opened on 20 December 2021. The contractor was Astaldi SpA.

As of 2021, the tunnel is the longest road tunnel in Poland. From the west, the tunnel entry begins at Węzeł Ursynów Zachód junction. In the east, the tunnel joins the Węzeł Ursynów Wschód junction. The tunnel is around 2,330 metres (7,640 ft) in length (some sources claim 2335 meters in length), and crosses underneath the pre-existing tunnel of the Warsaw Metro Line M1. Each of the two roadways has a width of 14.5 meters, with three traffic lanes each, and a hard shoulder 3.75 meters in width. Each roadway has a 1-meter wide emergency path.

== Route description ==
Country	Voivodeship	Location	km	mi	Exit	Name	Destinations	Notes
Poland	Masovian Voivodeship	Konotopa, Warsaw West County	455.7	283.2	—	Konotopa interchange	A 2 / E30 – Poznań, Łódź S 7 / E77 – Gdańsk S 8 / E67 – Białystok, Warszawa-Centrum, Praga Północ	• West end of S2 road designation, expressway continues as motorway A2 towards Poznań • Kilometrage continues from motorway A2 • Centrum means center • North-west end of S8 and E 67 overlap • West end of E 30 overlap
Poland	Masovian Voivodeship	Opacz-Kolonia	459.2	285.3	—	Opacz	DW 719 – Żyrardów	Part of Opacz interchange, accessible only from collector-distributor road Incomplete junction, the only exit/entry ramps: Lubelska interchange → Żyrardów; Żyrardów → Lubelska interchange
Poland	Masovian Voivodeship	Opacz-Kolonia	461.4	286.7	—	Opacz	S 7 / E77 – Kraków S 8 / E67 – Wrocław, Katowice Warszawa-Centrum	Part of Opacz interchange, accessible only from collector-distributor road Centrum means center South-east end of S8 and E 67 overlap
Poland	Masovian Voivodeship	Warsaw	463	288	—	Opacz	al. Krakowska – Centrum / Raszyn, Janki	Part of Opacz interchange, accessible only from collector-distributor road Centrum means center Access to Krakowska Avenue (Polish: Aleja Krakowska)
Poland	Masovian Voivodeship	Warsaw	468.2	290.9	—	Warszawa Lotnisko interchange	S 7 – (under construction) S 79 – Mokotów, Warsaw Chopin Airport, ul. Marynarska	S7 under construction; access to Marynarska Street (Polish: ulica Marynarska) through expressway S79 West end of S79 overlap
Poland	Masovian Voivodeship	Warsaw	470.2	292.2	R12	Puławska	DK 79 – Piaseczno / Sandomierz	East end of S79 overlap; access to Puławska Street (Polish: ulica Puławska)
Poland	Masovian Voivodeship	Warsaw	470.7	292.5	R13	Ursynów Zachód	local road – Ursynów, Instytut Onkologii, ul. Gandhi, ul. Płaskowickiej	Incomplete junction, the only exit/entry ramps: Konotopa interchange → Ursynów; Ursynów → Konotopa interchange; access to Institute of Oncology, Gandhi Street (Polish: ulica Gandhi) and Płaskowickiej Street (Polish: ulica Płaskowickiej)
Poland	Masovian Voivodeship	Warsaw	474	295	R13	Ursynów Wschód	local road – Ursynów	Incomplete junction, the only exit/entry ramps: Lubelska interchange → Ursynów; Ursynów → Lubelska interchange; Access to Branickiego Street (Polish: ulica Branickiego)
Poland	Masovian Voivodeship	Warsaw	475.5	295.5	R14	Warszawa Wilanów	DW 724 – Wilanów, Centrum / Góra Kalwaria	Access to Przyczółkowa Street (Polish: ulica Przyczółkowa) Centrum means center
Poland	Masovian Voivodeship	Warsaw	477.1	296.5	—	Czerniakowska-bis	local road – Mokotów	Proposed junction with planned section of Polski Walczącej Avenue (Polish: Aleja Polski Walczącej), known informally as Czerniakowska-bis Street (Polish: ulica Czerniakowska-bis)
Poland	Masovian Voivodeship	Warsaw	481	299	R15	Wał Miedzeszyński	DW 801 – Wawer, Praga Południe / Puławy	Access to Wał Miedzeszyński Street (Polish: ulica Wał Miedzeszyński)
Poland	Masovian Voivodeship	Warsaw	483.5	300.4	R16	Patriotów	ul. Patriotów – Otwock	Access to westbound Patriotów Street (Polish: ulica Patriotów)
Poland	Masovian Voivodeship	Warsaw	484.1	300.8	R16	Patriotów	ul. Patriotów – Centrum Zdrowia Dziecka, Rembertów	Access to eastbound Patriotów Street (Polish: ulica Patriotów)
Poland	Masovian Voivodeship	Majdan, Otwock County	489.7	304.3	R17	Lubelska	DK 17 – Warszawa S 17 / E372 – Lublin	Upgrade works on national road 17
Poland	Masovian Voivodeship	Izabela, Masovian Voivodeship	490.7	304.9	—		A 2 / E30 – Terespol	East end of S2 road designation, expressway continues as motorway A2 • Kilometrage continues on motorway A2 • East end of E 30 overlap
1.000 mi = 1.609 km; 1.000 km = 0.621 mi: Concurrency terminus; Incomplete access; Proposed; Route transition

== See also ==
- Highways in Poland
- European route E30
