= Zanecin =

Zanecin may refer to:

- Żanecin, Sokołów County, Poland
- Żanęcin, Otwock County, Poland
