= Lipowo, Masovian Voivodeship =

Lipowo
- Village
- Location within Poland
- Coordinates: 52°8′8″N 21°23′4″E
- Country: Poland
- Voivodeship: Masovian
- County: Otwock
- Gmina: Wiązowna
- Population: 100

Lipowo [liˈpɔvɔ] is a village in the administrative district of Gmina Wiązowna, within Otwock County, Masovian Voivodeship, in east-central Poland.
