= Kruszówiec =

- Village
- Location within Poland
- Coordinates: 52°13′N 21°42′E
- Country: Poland
- Voivodeship: Masovian
- County: Otwock
- Gmina: Wiązowna
- Population: 73

Kruszówiec [kruˈʂuvjɛt͡s] is a village in the administrative district of Gmina Wiązowna, within Otwock County, Masovian Voivodeship, in east-central Poland.
