= Pęclin =

- Village
- Location within Poland
- Coordinates: 52°10′N 21°21′E
- Country: Poland
- Voivodeship: Masovian
- County: Otwock
- Gmina: Wiązowna

Pęclin [ˈpɛnt͡slin] is a village in the administrative district of Gmina Wiązowna, within Otwock County, Masovian Voivodeship, in east-central Poland.
