= Gmina Wiązowna =

Gmina Wiązowna Wiązowna Commune
- Gmina
- Coat of arms
- Interactive map of Gmina Wiązowna
- Coordinates (Wiązowna): 52°10′N 21°19′E
- Country: Poland
- Voivodeship: Masovian
- County: Otwock
- Seat: Wiązowna

Area
  - Total: 102.12 km^{2} (39.43 sq mi)

Population (2006)
  - Total: 9,890
  - Density: 96.8/km^{2} (251/sq mi)
- Website: http://www.wiazowna.pl

Gmina Wiązowna is a rural gmina (administrative district) in Otwock County, Masovian Voivodeship, in east-central Poland. Its seat is the village of Wiązowna, which lies approximately 7 kilometres (4 mi) north-east of Otwock and 23 km (14 mi) east of Warsaw.

The gmina covers an area of 102.12 square kilometres (39.4 sq mi), and as of 2006 its total population is 9,890.

The gmina contains part of the protected area called Masovian Landscape Park.

== Villages ==
Gmina Wiązowna contains the villages and settlements of Bolesławów, Boryszew, Czarnówka, Duchnów, Dziechciniec, Emów, Glinianka, Góraszka, Izabela, Kopki, Kruszówiec, Lipowo, Majdan, Malcanów, Michałówek, Pęclin, Poręby, Radiówek, Rzakta, Stefanówka, Wiązowna, Wiązowna Kościelna, Wola Ducka, Wola Karczewska, Zagórze, Zakręt and Żanęcin.

== Neighbouring gminas ==
Gmina Wiązowna is bordered by Warsaw, by the towns of Józefów, Otwock and Sulejówek, and by the gminas of Celestynów, Dębe Wielkie, Halinów, Karczew, Kołbiel and Mińsk Mazowiecki.
