= Wiązowna =

- Village
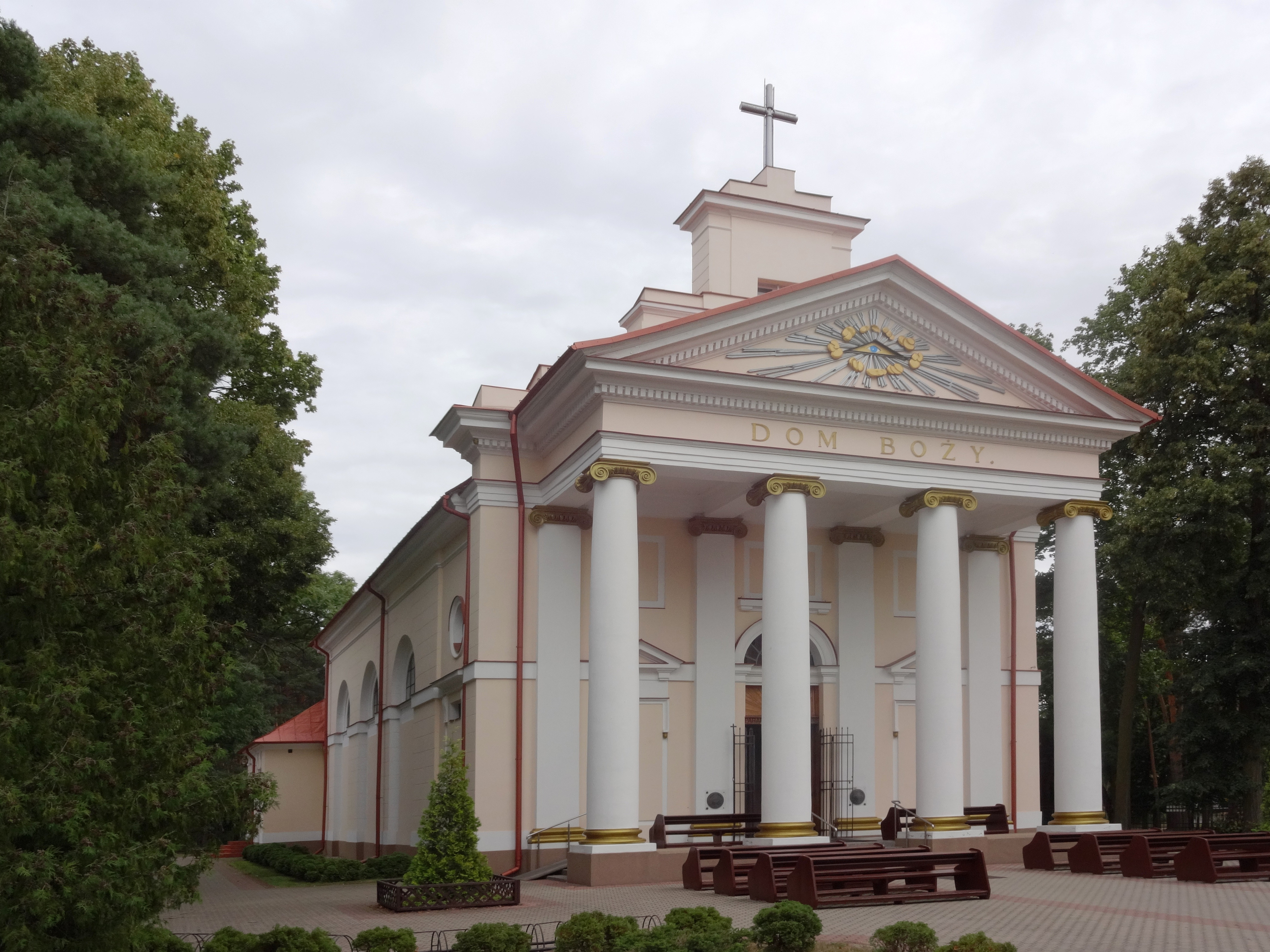
- Saint Adalbert church in Wiązowna

- Coat of arms

- Location within Poland
- Coordinates: 52°10′N 21°19′E
- Country: Poland
- Voivodeship: Masovian
- County: Otwock
- Gmina: Wiązowna

Population
  - Total: 980
- Time zone: UTC+1 (CET)
  - Summer (DST): UTC+2 (CEST)
- Vehicle registration: WOT
- Website: http://www.wiazowna.net

Wiązowna [vjɔ̃ˈzɔvna] is a village in Otwock County, Masovian Voivodeship, in east-central Poland. It is the seat of the gmina (administrative district) called Gmina Wiązowna.

== Climate ==
Wiązowna has a dry-summer humid continental climate (Köppen Dsb).

Climate data for Wiązowna
Month	Jan	Feb	Mar	Apr	May	Jun	Jul	Aug	Sep	Oct	Nov	Dec	Year
Mean daily maximum °C (°F)	−0.5 (31.1)	1.4 (34.5)	7.1 (44.8)	14.2 (57.6)	19.1 (66.4)	22.9 (73.2)	24.6 (76.3)	24.9 (76.8)	18.9 (66.0)	12.4 (54.3)	7.0 (44.6)	2.0 (35.6)	12.8 (55.1)
Mean daily minimum °C (°F)	−4.0 (24.8)	−2.7 (27.1)	0.6 (33.1)	4.8 (40.6)	8.9 (48.0)	12.8 (55.0)	14.7 (58.5)	14.8 (58.6)	10.5 (50.9)	6.1 (43.0)	2.9 (37.2)	−1.4 (29.5)	5.7 (42.2)
Average precipitation mm (inches)	101 (4.0)	74 (2.9)	57 (2.2)	19 (0.7)	41 (1.6)	28 (1.1)	30 (1.2)	28 (1.1)	19 (0.7)	30 (1.2)	26 (1.0)	57 (2.2)	510 (19.9)
Average rainfall mm (inches)	21 (0.8)	23 (0.9)	21 (0.8)	14 (0.6)	41 (1.6)	28 (1.1)	30 (1.2)	28 (1.1)	19 (0.7)	19 (0.7)	14 (0.6)	21 (0.8)	279 (10.9)
Average snowfall cm (inches)	80 (31)	51 (20)	36 (14)	5 (2.0)	0 (0)	0 (0)	0 (0)	0 (0)	0 (0)	11 (4.3)	12 (4.7)	36 (14)	231 (90)
Average precipitation days	6.3	6.4	10.2	7.9	12.8	11.3	14.3	9.0	8.2	8.1	6.8	7.9	109.2
Average snowy days	10.2	8.0	3.8	0.4	0	0	0	0	0	0.5	1.4	6.6	30.9
Average relative humidity (%)	89	88	77	69	72	71	71	67	73	78	85	87	77
Mean monthly sunshine hours	86.8	81.9	158.1	255.0	279.0	294.0	306.9	331.7	240.0	179.8	129.0	102.3	2,444.5
Average ultraviolet index	1	2	2	4	5	5	6	5	3	2	1	1	3
Source: Weather Atlas
