= Wiązowna Kościelna =

- Village
- Location within Poland
- Coordinates: 52°10′18″N 21°18′18″E
- Country: Poland
- Voivodeship: Masovian
- County: Otwock
- Gmina: Wiązowna

Wiązowna Kościelna [vjɔ̃ˈzɔvna kɔɕˈt͡ɕɛlna] is a village in the administrative district of Gmina Wiązowna, within Otwock County, Masovian Voivodeship, in east-central Poland.
