= Emów =

- Village
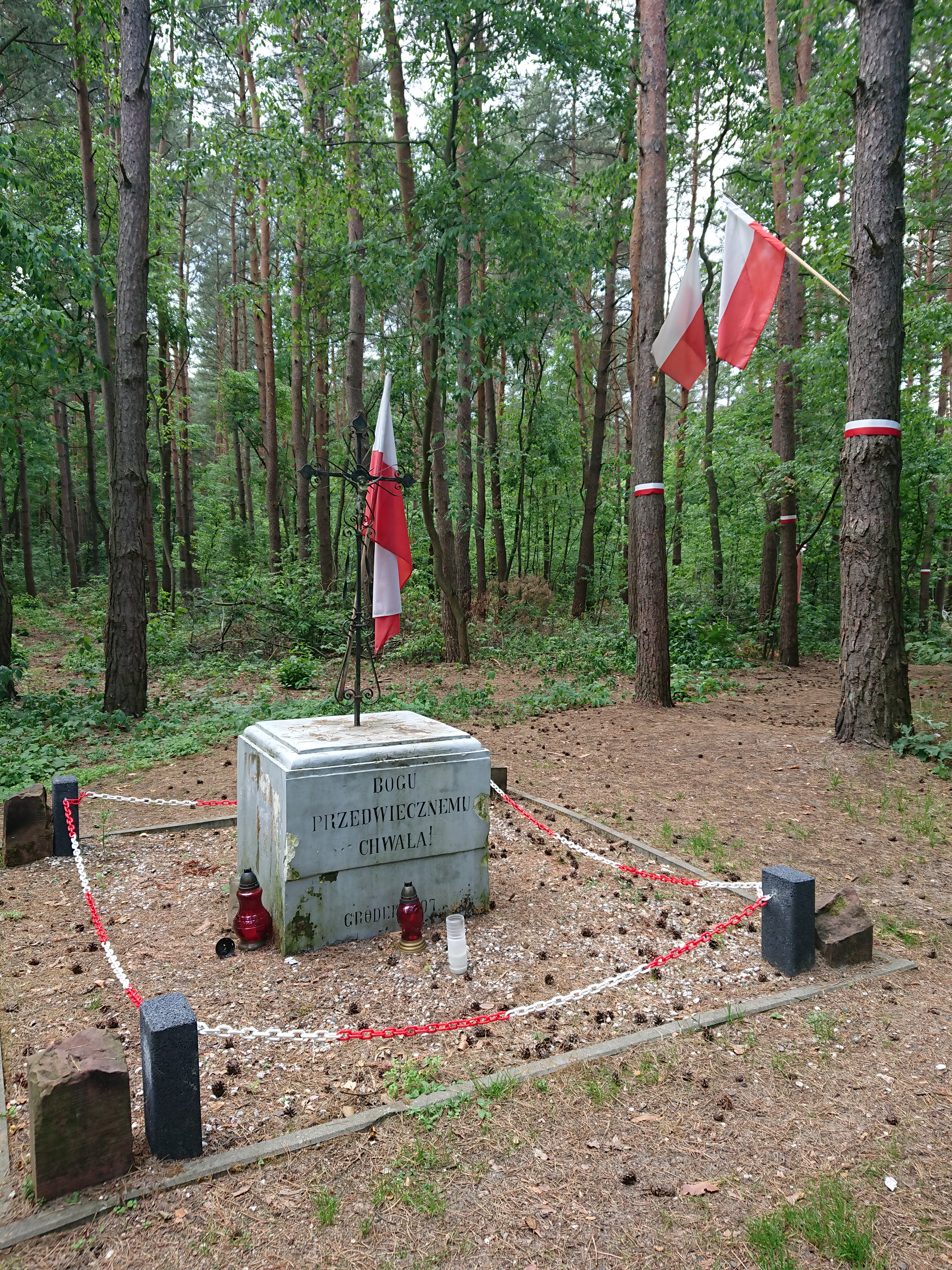
- January Uprising insurgents grave in Emów

- Location within Poland
- Coordinates: 52°9′N 21°17′E
- Country: Poland
- Voivodeship: Masovian
- County: Otwock
- Gmina: Wiązowna

Emów [ˈɛmuf] is a village in the administrative district of Gmina Wiązowna, within Otwock County, Masovian Voivodeship, in east-central Poland, within the Warsaw metropolitan area.
