= Zakręt, Otwock County =

Zakręt
- Village
- Location within Poland
- Coordinates: 52°13′0″N 21°16′59″E
- Country: Poland
- Voivodeship: Masovian
- County: Otwock
- Gmina: Wiązowna

Zakręt [ˈzakrɛnt] is a village in the administrative district of Gmina Wiązowna, within Otwock County, Masovian Voivodeship, in east-central Poland.
