= Warsaw Chopin Airport =

Airport in Warsaw, Poland

Warsaw Chopin Airport Lotnisko Chopina w Warszawie

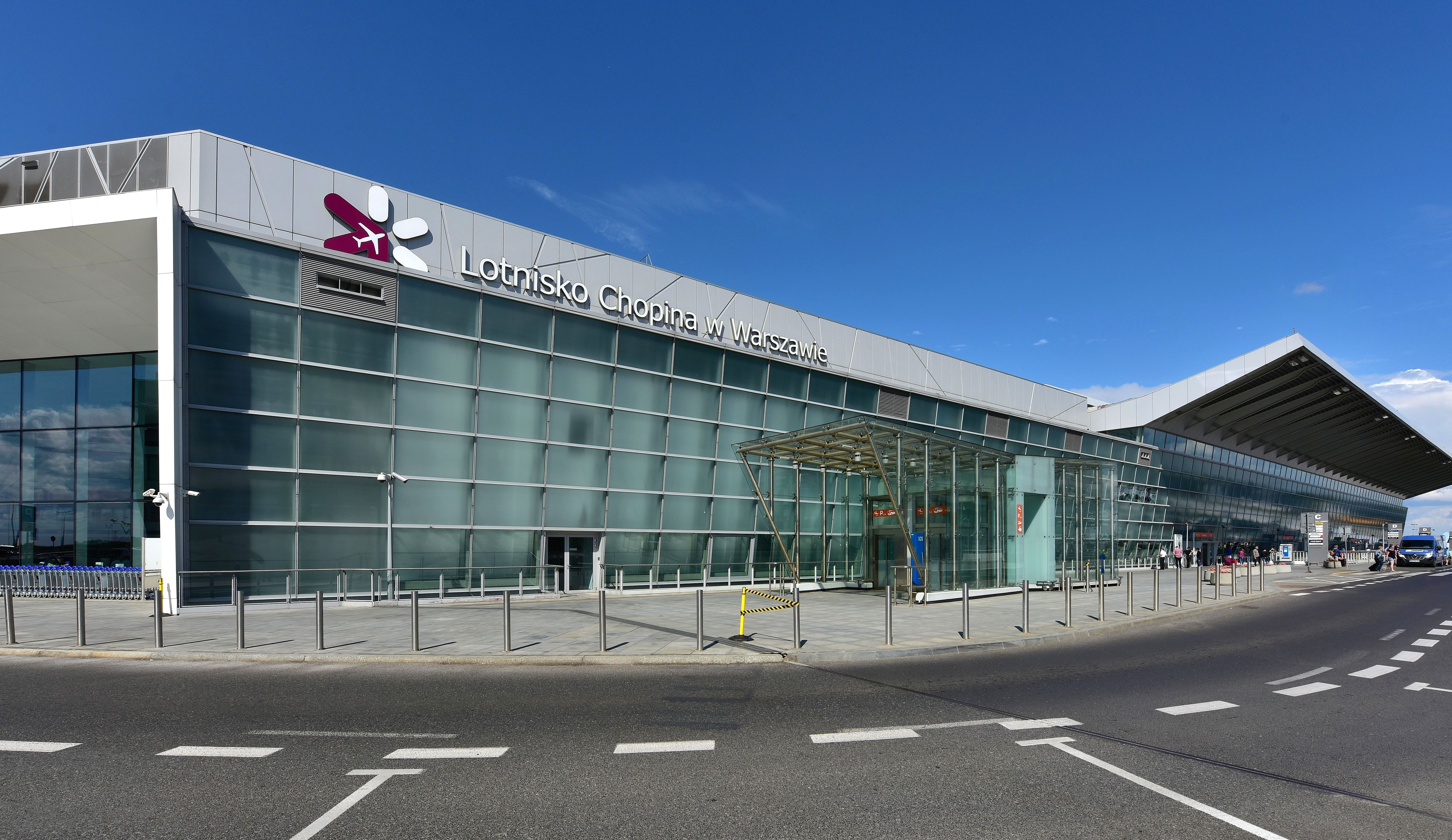
- IATA: WAW; ICAO: EPWA

Summary
- Airport type: Public
- Owner/Operator: Polish Airports State Enterprise (PPL)
- Serves: Warsaw metropolitan area
- Location: Okęcie, Włochy, Warsaw, Poland
- Opened: 29 April 1934; 92 years ago
- Hub for: LOT Polish Airlines
- Operating base for: Enter Air; Smartwings Poland; SprintAir; Wizz Air
- Elevation AMSL: 362 ft (110 m)
- Coordinates: 52°09′57″N 20°58′02″E
- Website: www.lotnisko-chopina.pl/en/index.html

Map
- Location of airport in Poland WAW/EPWA (Warsaw)

Runways
Direction	Length		Surface
Direction	m	ft	Surface
11/29	2,800	9,186	Asphalt
15/33	3,690	12,106	Asphalt

Statistics (2025)
- Passengers: 24,097,059
- Passenger change: ▲13.2%
- Source: www.lotnisko-chopina.pl

Warsaw Chopin Airport (Polish: Lotnisko Chopina w Warszawie, Polish pronunciation: [lɔtˈɲiskɔ ʂɔˈpɛna]) (IATA: WAW, ICAO: EPWA) is an international airport in the Włochy district of Warsaw, Poland. It is the busiest airport in Poland and the 28th busiest airport in Europe with 24.1 million passengers in 2025, handling approximately a third of the country's total air passenger traffic. The airport is a central hub for LOT Polish Airlines as well as a base for Enter Air and Wizz Air.

Warsaw Chopin Airport covers 834 hectares (2,060 acres) of land and handles approximately 300 scheduled flights daily, including a substantial number of charters. London, Frankfurt, Paris, and Amsterdam are the busiest international connections, while Kraków, Wrocław, and Gdańsk are the most popular domestic ones. Founded in 1934, the airport was previously known as Warsaw Okęcie Airport (Port lotniczy Warszawa-Okęcie) and bore the name of its Okęcie neighborhood throughout its history. It was renamed in honour of Polish composer and former Warsaw resident Frédéric Chopin in 2001. Despite the official change, "Okęcie" ("Lotnisko Okęcie") remains in popular and industry use, including air traffic and aerodrome references.

An underground railway station connecting from the airport to Warsaw's suburban rail system was opened in June 2012 in time for the Euro 2012 football championships, and on 25 November 2013, the airport announced accommodating – for the first time in history – its 10 millionth passenger in a single year. The airport would go on and double the amount of passengers 11 years later, welcoming its 20 millionth passenger on 6 December 2024 and 21 millionth on 26 December 2024.

The Chopin Airport is one of the three airports serving the Warsaw metropolitan area, along with Warsaw Modlin Airport, which opened in 2012, and Warsaw Radom Airport, which opened in 2023. In 2024, Chopin Airport announced plans for expansion, boosting passenger capacity to serve over 30 million travelers annually. Construction began in late 2025 and is slated for completion by 2029, ahead of the Central Communication Port’s planned 2032 opening.

== History ==
=== The pre-war and wartime Okęcie (1934–45) ===
In 1924, when urban development around Warsaw's aerodrome at Mokotów Field (Pole Mokotowskie) began affecting air traffic, the Ministry of Railways purchased land near the village of Okęcie to construct a new airport. On 29 April 1934, the Polish president, Ignacy Mościcki, opened Central Airport (Okęcie), which from then on took over the handling of all traffic from the former civilian aerodrome at Pole Mokotowskie.

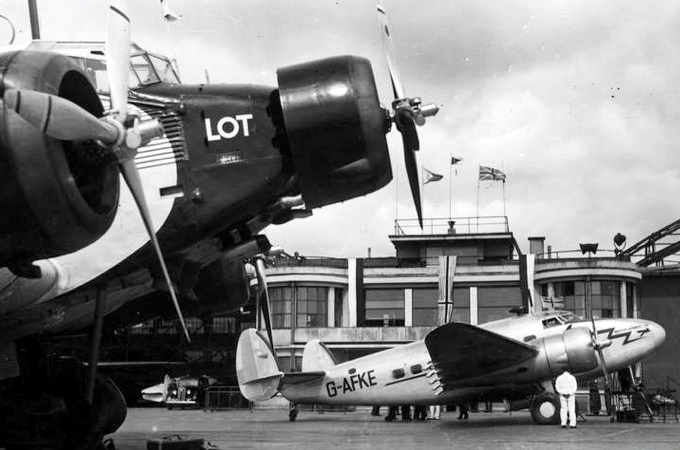
The first British Airways flight from Warsaw to London waiting alongside a LOT Junkers Ju 52 at Okęcie in April 1939

With the building finished in 1933, the new modernist premises of the Warsaw airport cost the State Treasury around zl 10 million. The new complex included three hangars, exhibition space, garages, and of course a large, modern terminal building with a concrete taxiway complete with stands for a number of aircraft. Warsaw thus received an airport befitting of any European capital city. In its first year of operation, Okęcie served over 10,000 passengers.

As air traffic and the number of aircraft movements grew greatly year on year, the authorities identified the need to develop a new system for air traffic navigation and control. The state, as a result, marked a number of air corridors for use by civil airlines, whilst radio stations were established to regulate such traffic and divert it away from sensitive and restricted areas. By 1938, the airport was equipped with 16 immigration checkpoints for passengers both departing and arriving on international flights. These posts were then manned by the Polish Border Guard. By 1937, the airport had also received new radio navigation equipment and was using Lorenz beam technology to assure the safety of landings and approaches over Warsaw, during periods of poor visibility or bad weather. On the eve of World War II, Okęcie airport was connected by regular scheduled flights with 6 domestic and 17 foreign airports, among which were Lydda near Jaffa, Palestine (now Tel-Aviv-Yafo) and Beirut in Lebanon; there were also plans to soon begin transatlantic service to the United States.

During World War II, Okęcie was often used as a battleground between the German Army and Polish resistance and was almost completely destroyed. From the very first day of the war in Poland, Okęcie became a target for bombing by the German Luftwaffe. Later, once Warsaw was occupied by the German army, the airport became the base for two German aviation schools and a Junkers aircraft repair works. During this period, the airport also received its first concrete runway and taxiways; these were left undamaged until the very final days of the war, despite numerous attacks by both the Home Army and Soviet Armed Forces. However, with the German withdrawal from the city, both Okęcie's remaining buildings and ground infrastructure (including the runway) were intentionally destroyed in order to deny their use to the advancing Red Army and Polish First Army.

=== Rebuilding Okęcie in the years 1945–1989 ===
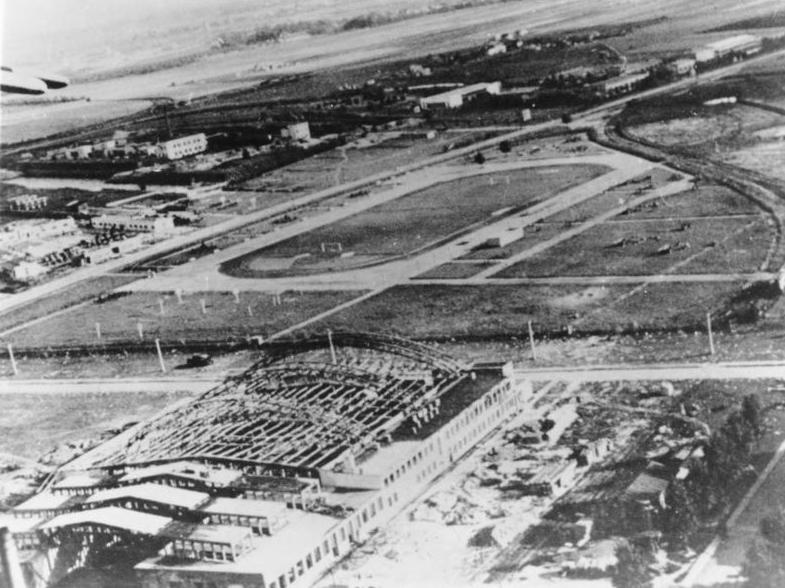
The destroyed PZL works at Warsaw Okęcie in 1939

After the war, LOT Polish Airlines resumed operations at Okęcie using what was left of the pre-war infrastructure; the airline was also responsible for initiating reconstruction efforts at the airport, and soon, within two years, a new terminal, control tower and a number of stands for aircraft based at and visiting the new Okęcie had been completed.

By the end of the 1940s, the airport had been reconnected with most of Poland's most important cities and a number of international services, including those to Moscow, Belgrade, Berlin, Bucharest, Budapest, Brussels, Copenhagen, Prague and Stockholm. In the first half of the 1950s, this development continued and the airport authorities continued to hold talks with many international airlines on the subject of opening routes to Warsaw. In 1956, maintenance of Okęcie was transferred from LOT Polish Airlines to state administration, then later in 1959, on the government's initiative, a decision was made to reconstruct the airport's main terminal; this, however, did not actually take place until 1964.

The new civil aviation authority began to exercise control over airports, air corridors and routing, ground aviation infrastructure and the responsibility for entering into and signing aviation accords with other states. This gave the authority effectively complete control over Warsaw's airport.

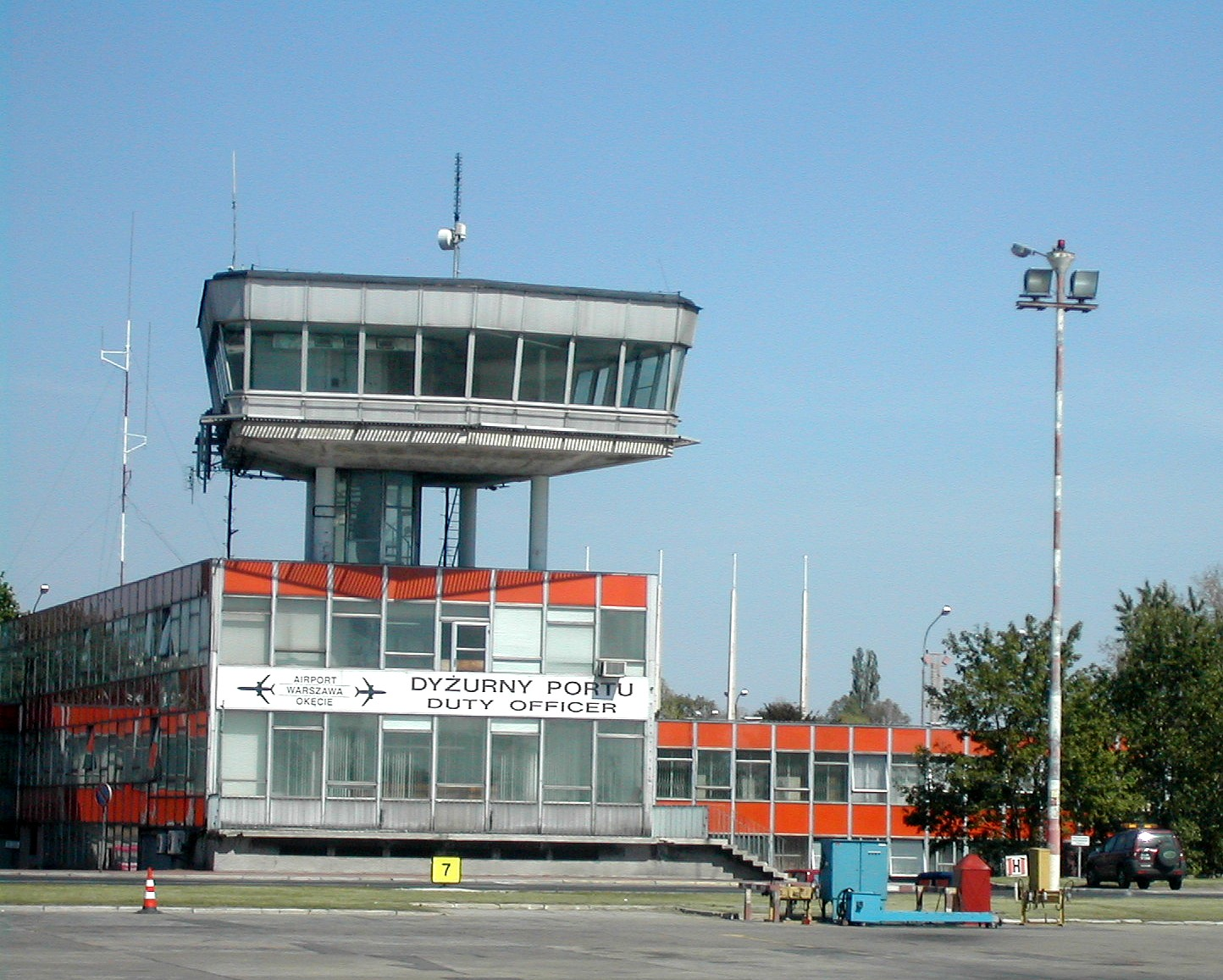
The 1960s terminal buildings at Warsaw's Chopin Airport in 2003 (since demolished)

In 1969, the new terminal officially became operational, with it celebrating, just one year later, its first million passengers served. However, it soon became apparent that the new terminal was too small. As a result of this situation, and to alleviate the problems it was causing, part of the airport's administrative office was moved to the south of the terminal and into makeshift buildings and the old airport premises on Ul. 17 Stycznia. A new separate, temporary arrival hall was then built. Meanwhile, domestic flights continued to operate from the facilities built on the site of the pre-war terminal. Some years later, in 1978, a new arrivals hall, the so-called 'Finnish Hall' opened.

Political events of the early 1980s caused a decline in passenger traffic, but already by 1983, there was renewed growth, especially on international routes. However, it turned out that the existing airport infrastructure was not able to handle as much traffic as the airport was dealing with by this period; thus, in November 1986, the Government decided to expand the airport. In the face of economic reform in the late 1980s, there was also a need to create a new managing body for airports and air traffic in Poland. In October 1987, a new company, the State Enterprise "Polish Airports" (PPL), an independent, self-governing and self-financing entity of the national economy, replaced the state aviation administration as the manager of the airport. The company was managed under the authority of the minister responsible for communications and transport.

=== Post-communist development (since 1989) ===
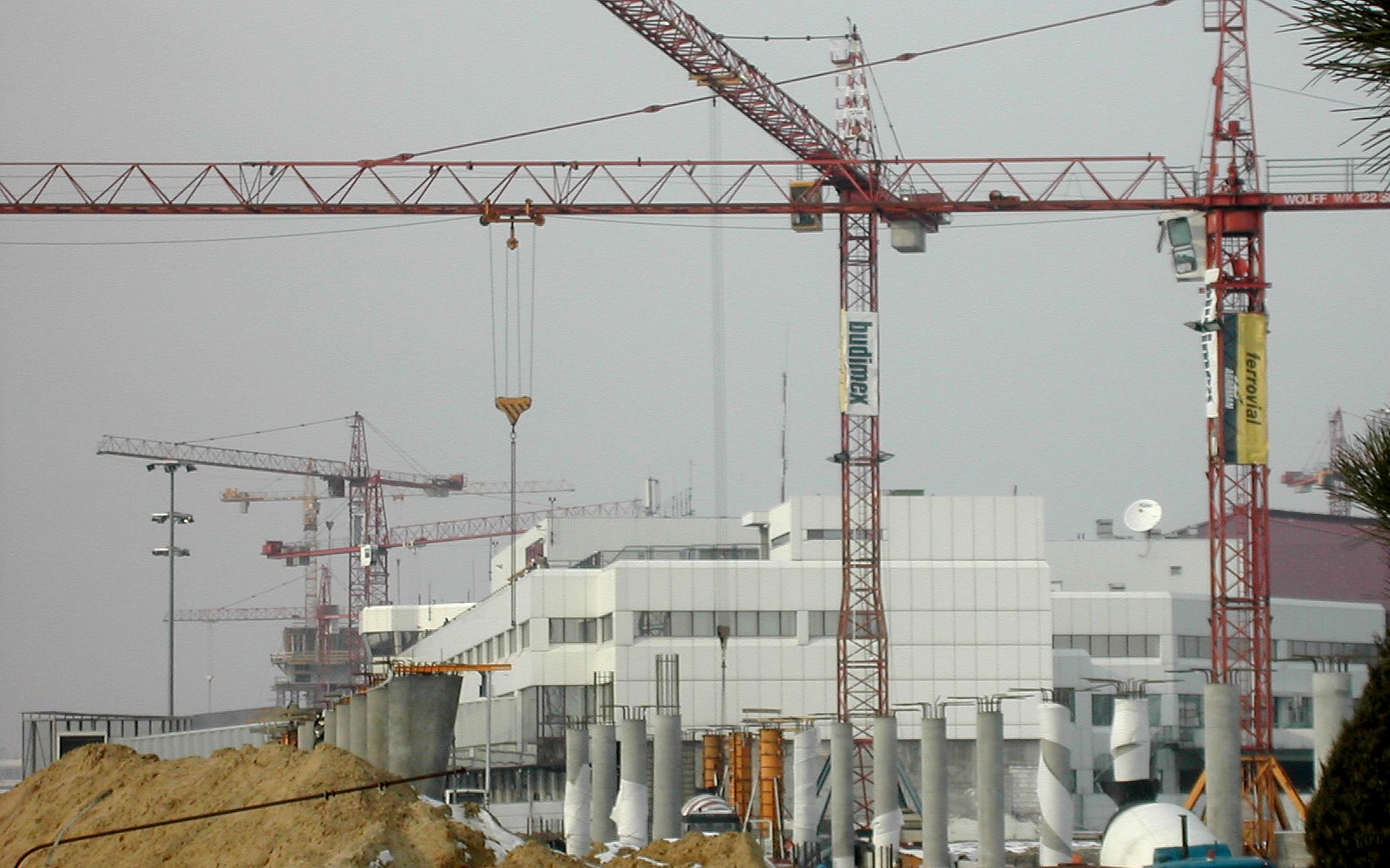
Ongoing construction of Terminal 2 at Warsaw Chopin in 2005

It was only in 1990, after the fall of communism, that a new terminal started to be built at Okęcie.

In March 2001, Warsaw Airport was renamed in honour of the renowned Polish pianist and composer Frédéric Chopin (though this name is less popular with residents of Warsaw, and many visitors know the airport as Okęcie). A year later, a tender for the construction of a new passenger terminal at Warsaw airport was announced, this was then won by the Polish-Spanish consortium of Ferrovial Agromán, Budimex and Estudio Lamela, who joined in 2004 to implement the largest Polish investment in civil aviation history, Chopin Airport's long-awaited 'Terminal 2'. By 2006, the arrivals level of this new terminal had been inaugurated, with the departures level finally, after a long delay due to certification issues, being opened in late 2007. In this same year, the low-cost Etiuda terminal was also opened; this, however, was closed again just two years later in 2009, with all operations being transferred to terminals 1 and 2. The final and most recent developments in the airport's history came in the period covering 2010–2011, when the airport's new central and south piers were finished (left unfinished until the possibility of connecting them with the north pier appeared) and opened along with a redesigned terminal complex which saw the airport's two terminals merged to form a single 'Terminal A' complex. Despite this, work continues on reconstructing taxiways, ramps and access roads, the most important projects of which will see the airport connected to Poland's expressway network via the S79 Airport Expressway and S2 Southern Warsaw Bypass. An underground railway station connected to Warsaw's suburban rail system was opened in June 2012 in time for the UEFA Euro 2012 football championships.

As of July 2015, the airport is managed by the State Enterprise "Polish Airports" (PPL), which has existed since 1987 and deals with construction and operation of airports and provision of services to passengers and airlines. PPL is owned and managed by the Ministry of Infrastructure and Development, in line with the 1987 Act.

== Runways ==
The airport has two intersecting runways, whose configuration and available taxiways under current rules permit 34 passenger operations (takeoffs or landings) per hour.

== Terminals ==
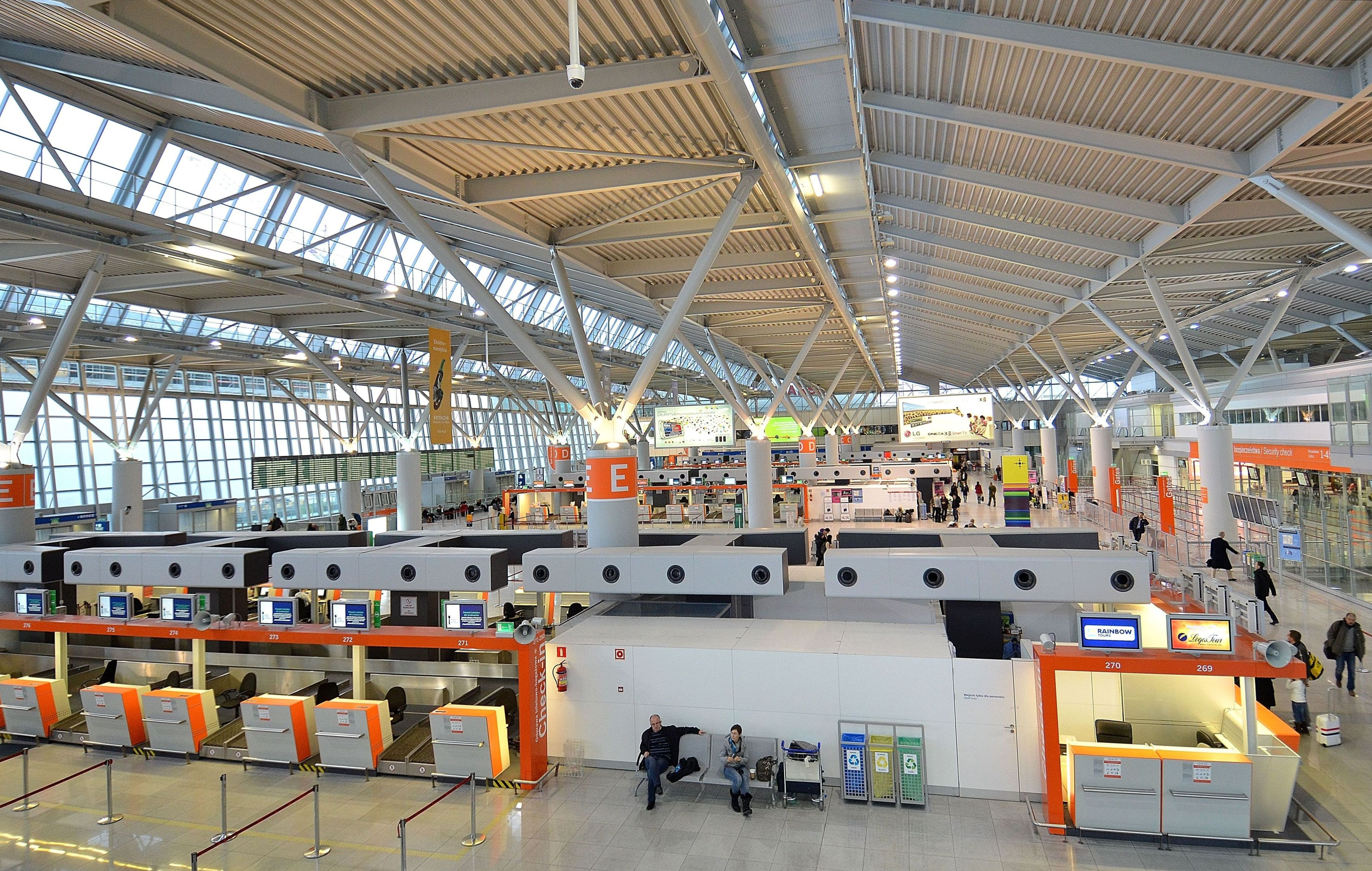
Check-in hall at zones C, D, E

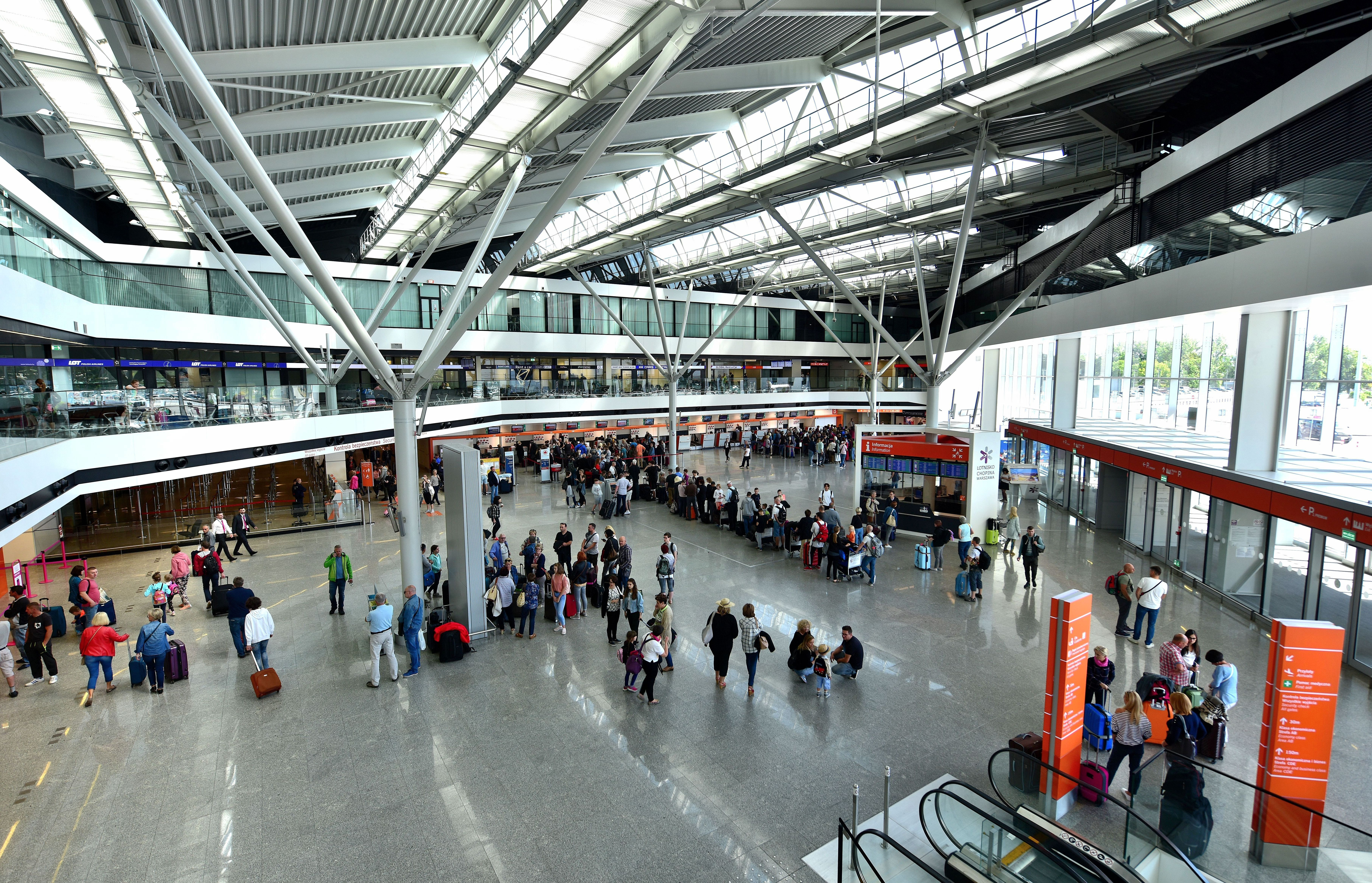
Check-in hall at zones A, B

=== Overview ===
In 2010, the designation of terminals had changed and the entire former Terminal 1 and Terminal 2 complex is now designated as Terminal A divided into five check-in areas (A, B, C, D, E) in two main halls. The complex contains 116 check-in desks. Additionally LOT Polish Airlines, Lufthansa, Finnair, Turkish Airlines, KLM and Air France passengers can use one of the 23 self-service check-in stands located in the Terminal. There are 45 passenger gates, 27 of which are equipped with jetways.

=== South hall ===
The south hall contains the check-in areas A and B (former Terminal 1) was built in 1992 with a capacity for 3.5 million passengers per year to replace the ageing complex from the Communist era. Initially, it handled all the traffic. Since 2007, the T2, a newly built terminal adjacent to T1, has been gradually taking over the major part of the traffic. Reconstruction of the south hall started on 13 September 2012. On 23 May 2015, the redesigned, reconstructed south hall was fully integrated into the 'Terminal A' complex. Before its refurbishment, the south hall was very recognisable by Poles for its very characteristically dark red colour of many construction elements, including the roof that covered the departure hall, pillars, frames of doors and windows and other. In Polish, it was called "buraczkowy", which simply means "beetroot-coloured" in English.

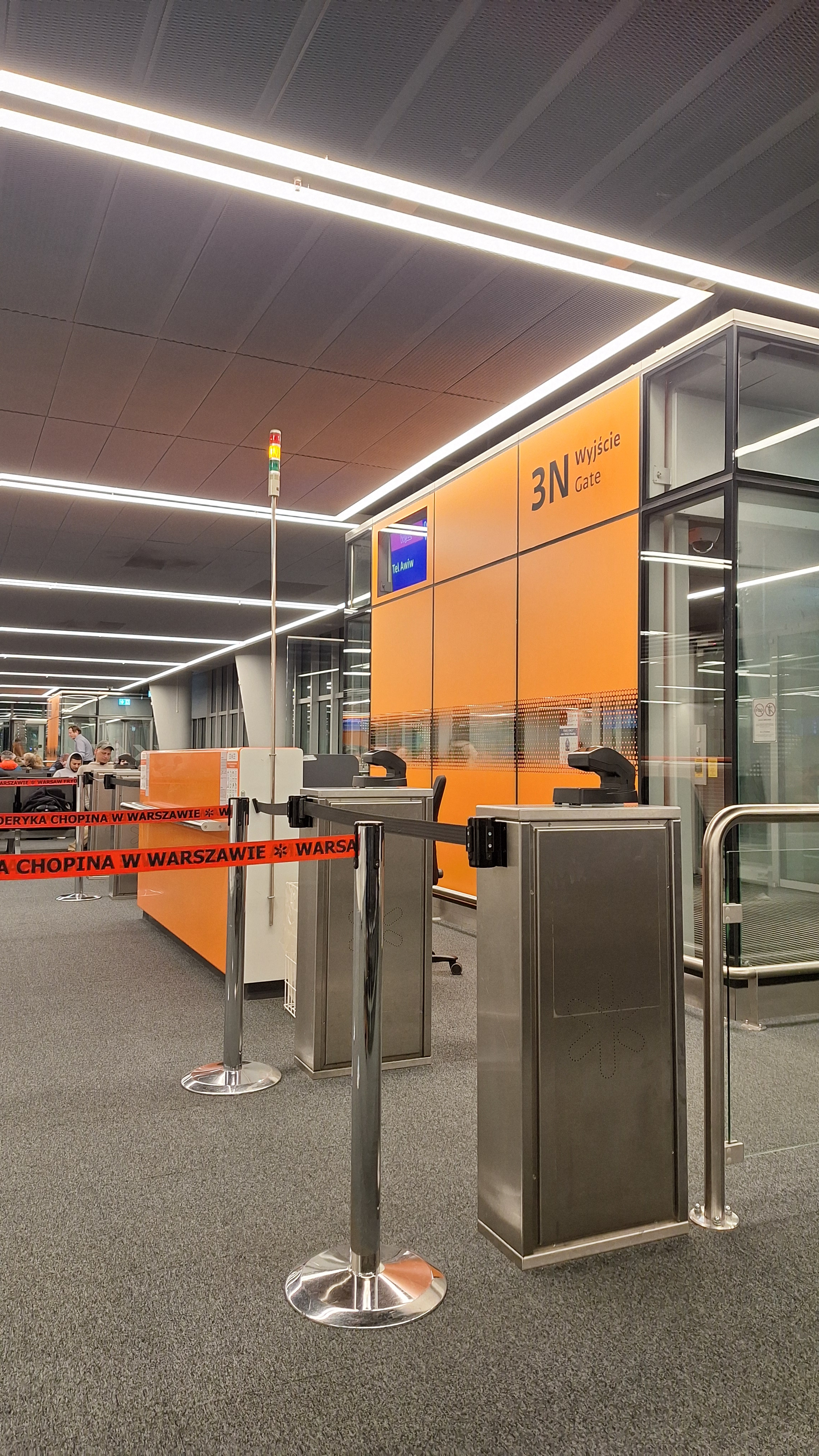
Gate in the Non-Schengen zone in Terminal A

=== North hall ===
This new terminal (formerly known as Terminal 2), featuring the check-in areas C, D and E, became fully operational on 12 March 2008, two years after the originally planned opening date. The arrivals area was in operation from mid-2007 but problems with safety certification and disagreements between the airport and the construction firm delayed full operation. The new terminal is considerably larger than the older Terminal 1 and has taken over departures for all Star Alliance and Oneworld airlines and a few other carriers. August 2014 saw Chopin Airport as one of the first European airports offering free unlimited Internet access to all its passengers and visitors.

=== Expansion ===
In 2024, Chopin Airport announced plans to expand its capacity to accommodate rising demand ahead of the planned opening of the Central Communication Port in 2032. The airport's total footprint will grow by 15%, adding 21 gates for wide-body aircraft and 9 gates for narrow-body aircraft, and will be capable of serving over 30 million passengers annually. Plans will also involve expanding airport's cargo capacity. Initial construction work began in late summer 2025 and is scheduled to be completed by 2029.

== Airlines and destinations ==
The following airlines operate regular scheduled and charter flights to and from Warsaw–Chopin:

Airlines	Destinations
Aegean Airlines	Athens
Aer Lingus	Seasonal: Dublin
Air Arabia	Sharjah
Air China	Beijing–Capital
Air France	Paris–Charles de Gaulle
Austrian Airlines	Vienna; Seasonal: Innsbruck
British Airways	London–Heathrow
Brussels Airlines	Brussels
Corendon Airlines	Seasonal: Antalya
Emirates	Dubai–International
Enter Air	Seasonal charter: Antalya, Bodrum, Burgas, Colombo–Bandaranaike, Dalaman, Enfidha, Fuerteventura, Gran Canaria, Heraklion, Hurghada, İzmir, Jerez de la Frontera, Kos, Marsa Alam, Sharm El Sheikh, Tirana
Ethiopian Airlines	Addis Ababa
Etihad Airways	Abu Dhabi
Eurowings	Düsseldorf
Finnair	Helsinki
flydubai	Dubai–International
KLM	Amsterdam
LOT Polish Airlines	Almaty, Amsterdam, Astana, Athens, Bangkok–Suvarnabhumi Baku, Belgrade, Berlin, Billund, Bologna, Brussels, Bucharest–Otopeni, Budapest, Bydgoszcz, Cairo, Chicago–O'Hare, Chișinău, Cluj-Napoca, Copenhagen, Delhi, Dubrovnik, Düsseldorf, Frankfurt, Gdańsk, Geneva, Gothenburg, Hamburg, Hanoi (resumes 31 March 2027), Istanbul, Katowice, Košice, Kraków, Larnaca, Lisbon, Ljubljana, London–Heathrow, Los Angeles, Lublin, Luxembourg, Lyon, Madrid, Málaga, Malta, Miami, Milan–Malpensa, Mumbai, Munich, New York–JFK, Newark, Nice, Oradea, Oslo, Ostrava, Paris–Charles de Gaulle, Porto, Poznań, Prague, Reykjavík–Keflavik, Riga, Riyadh, Rome–Fiumicino, Rzeszów, Seoul–Incheon, Stavanger, Stockholm–Arlanda, Szczecin, Tallinn, Tashkent, Tel Aviv, Thessaloniki, Tokyo–Narita, Toronto–Pearson, Venice, Vienna, Vilnius, Wrocław, Yerevan, Zagreb, Zielona Góra, Zurich; Seasonal: Beirut, Dubai–International, Heraklion, Marrakesh, Palma de Mallorca, Podgorica, Rovaniemi, San Francisco, Sarajevo, Skopje, Split, Strasbourg, Tenerife–South, Tromsø (begins 1 December 2026), Turin (resumes 16 January 2027); Seasonal charter: Antalya, Bodrum, Cancún, Denpasar, Girona, İzmir, Krabi, Langkawi, Malé, Mauritius, Nosy Be, Penang, Phuket, Porlamar, Phu Quoc, Puerto Plata, Punta Cana, Zanzibar
Lufthansa	Frankfurt, Munich
Neos	Charter: Bangkok–Suvarnabhumi, Krabi, Milan–Malpensa; Seasonal charter: Malé
Norwegian Air Shuttle	Oslo
Pegasus Airlines	Ankara; Seasonal: Antalya, Izmir
Ryanair	Alicante, Catania, Charleroi, Málaga, Leeds/Bradford, Manchester, Naples, Palma de Mallorca, Paphos, Pisa, Porto, Seville, Tirana
Scandinavian Airlines	Copenhagen
Sky Alps	Seasonal: Bolzano
Sky Express	Athens
Smartwings	Seasonal charter: Antalya, Catania, Colombo–Bandaranaike, Faro, Girona, Heraklion, Istanbul İzmir, Kavala, Kutaisi, Lamezia Terme, Muscat, Palermo, Patras, Taba, Tenerife-South, Tirana Tivat
Sundor	Tel Aviv
SunExpress	Seasonal: Antalya, İzmir
Swiss International Air Lines	Zurich
TAP Air Portugal	Lisbon
Turkish Airlines	Istanbul
Uzbekistan Airways	Tashkent (begins 5 April 2027)
Wizz Air	Alicante, Barcelona, Basel/Mulhouse, Bergamo, Bilbao, Bologna, Bratislava, Bucharest–Băneasa, Budapest, Catania, Charleroi, Copenhagen, Dortmund, Eindhoven, Kutaisi, Lamezia Terme, Larnaca, Leeds/Bradford, Liverpool, London–Luton, Madrid, Málaga, Malta, Milan–Malpensa, Naples, Nice, Paris–Orly, Pisa, Reykjavík–Keflavik, Rome–Fiumicino, Sandefjord, Seville, Stockholm–Skavsta, Tel Aviv, Tenerife–South, Valencia, Venice; Seasonal: Agadir, Brașov, Chania, Corfu, Faro, Funchal, Genoa, Grenoble, Lisbon, Menorca, Olbia, Palma de Mallorca, Porto, Split, Tallinn, Tirana, Turin, Verona, Zadar

== Statistics ==
=== Annual traffic ===
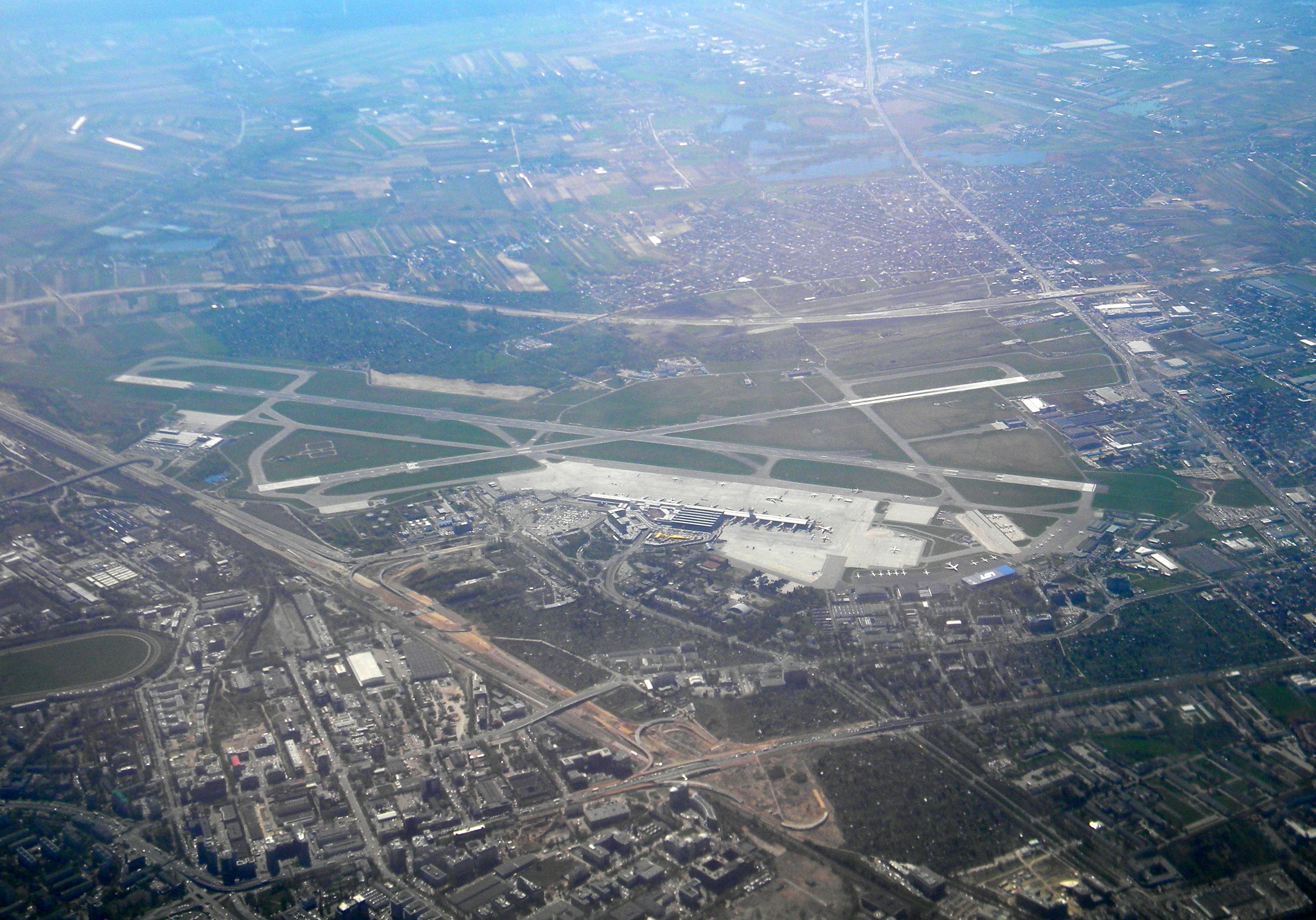
Aerial view

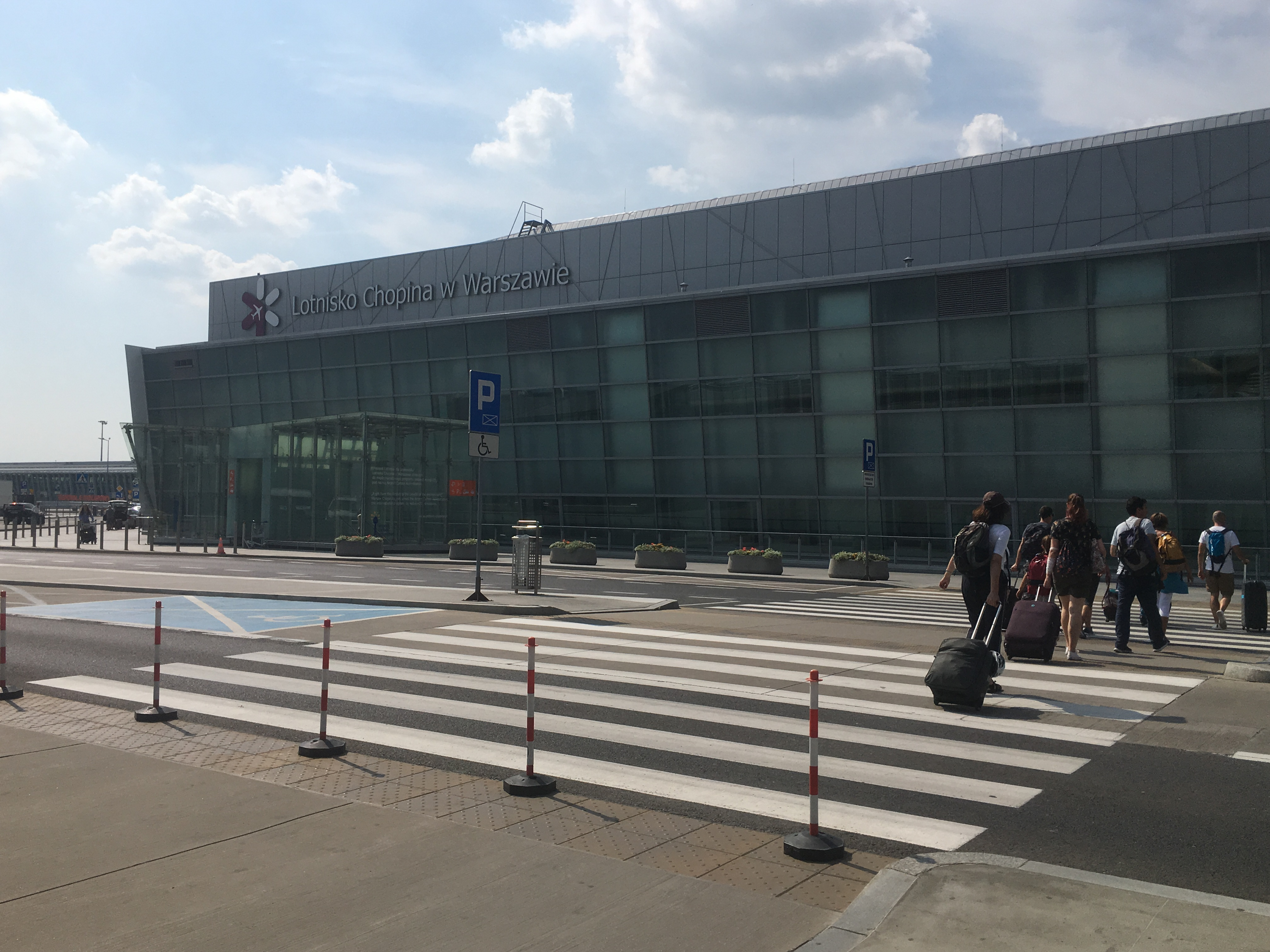
Terminal A

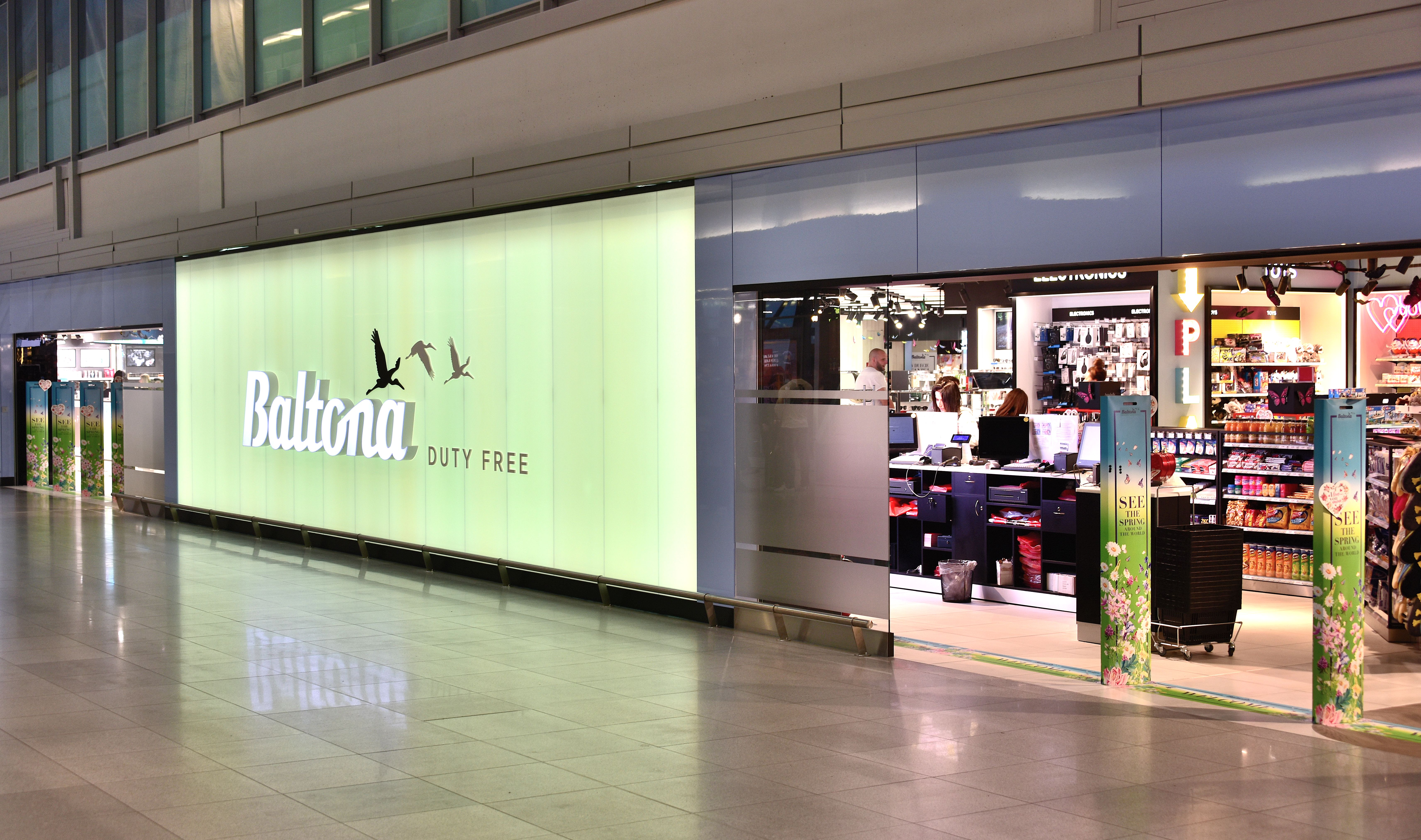
Duty-free area

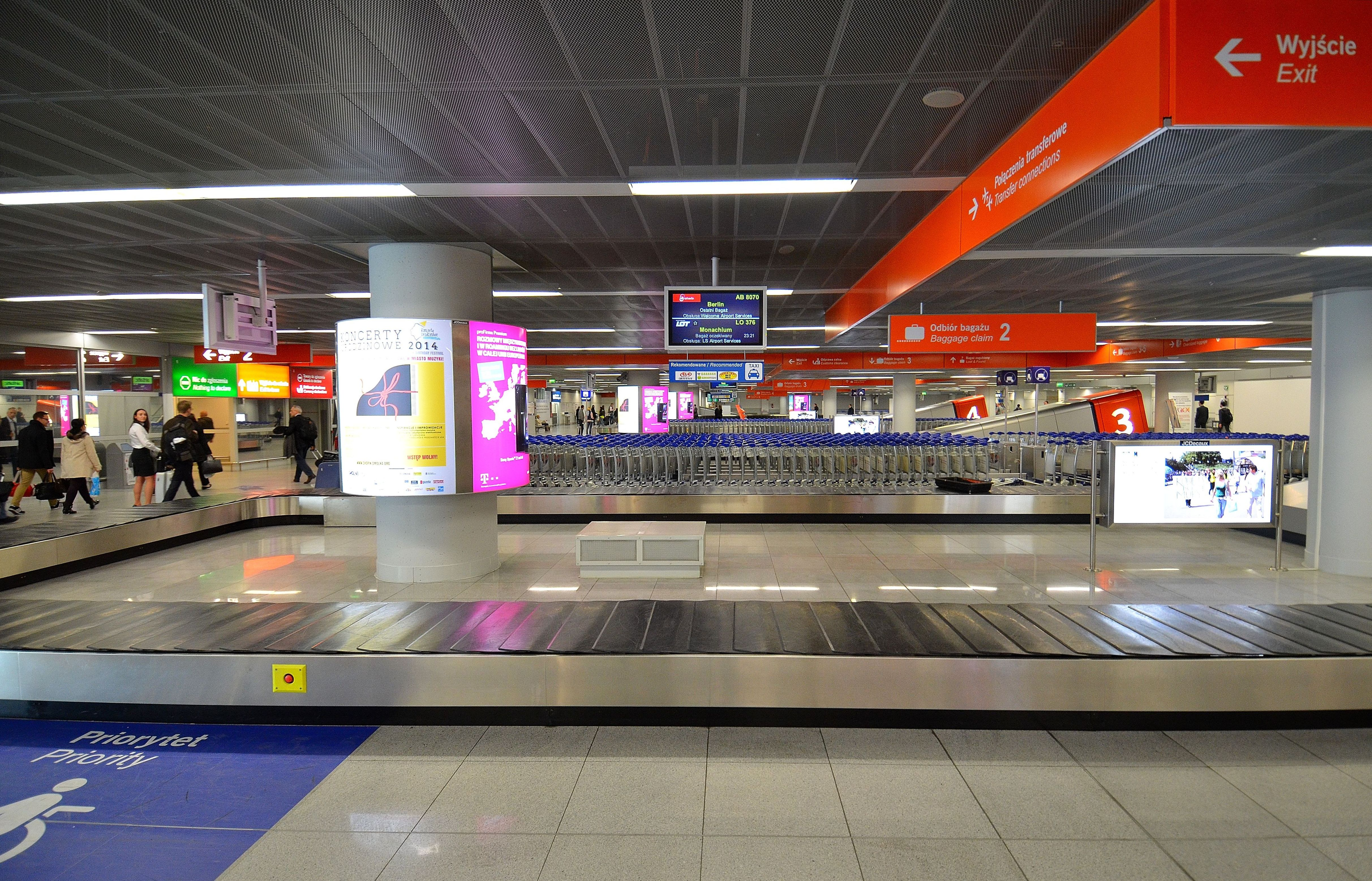
Airport baggage claim at Terminal A

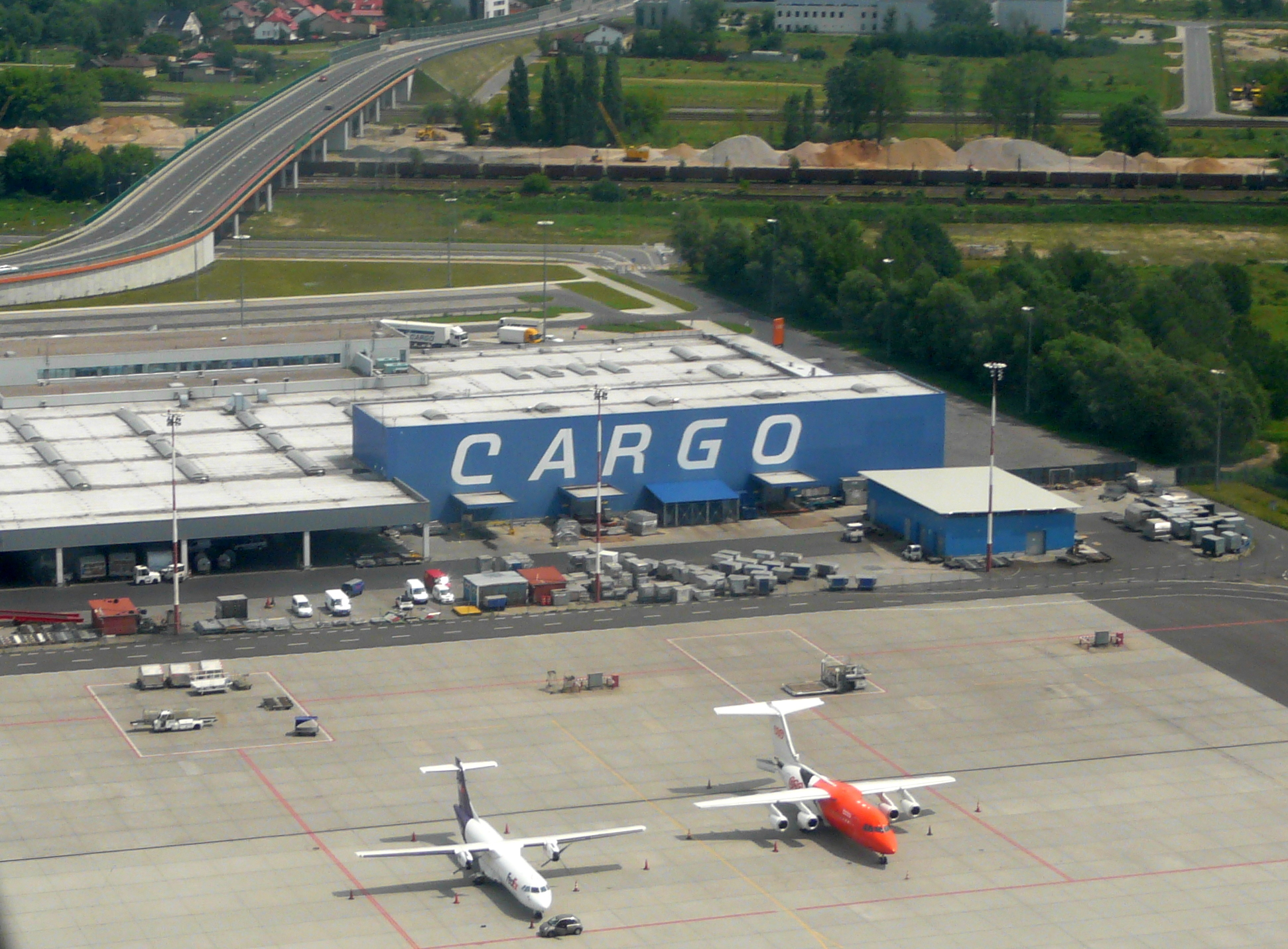
Cargo terminal

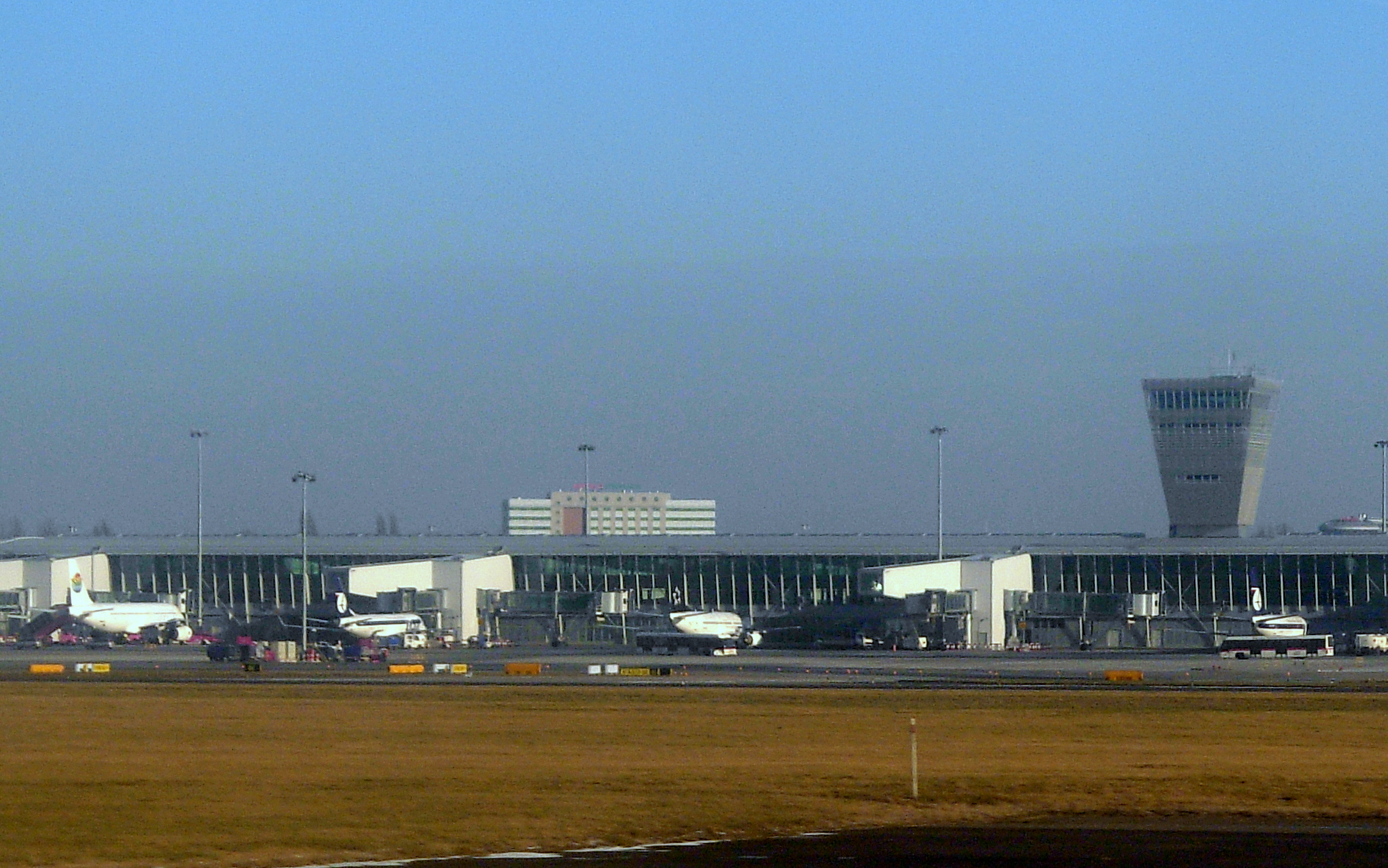
Apron view

Annual passenger traffic
Year	Passengers	% change
2005	7,071,881	Steady
2006	8,101,827	▲14.6%
2007	9,268,476	▲14.4%
2008	9,460,606	▲2.1%
2009	8,320,927	▼ −12.0%
2010	8,666,552	▲4.2%
2011	9,322,485	▲7.6%
2012	9,567,063	▲2.6%
2013	10,669,879	▲11.5%
2014	10,574,539	▼ −0.9%
2015	11,186,688	▲5.8%
2016	12,795,356	▲14.4%
2017	15,730,330	▲22.9%
2018	17,737,231	▲12.8%
2019	18,844,591	▲6.2%
2020	5,473,224	▼ −71.0%
2021	7,445,468	▲36.0%
2022	14,389,143	▲93.3%
2023	18,472,491	▲28.4%
2024	21,283,973	▲15.0%
2025	24,097,059	▲13.2%

Annual aircraft movements
Year	Aircraft movements	% change
2005	115,320	Steady
2006	126,534	▲9.7%
2007	133,146	▲5.2%
2008	129,728	▼ −2.6%
2009	115,934	▼ −10.6%
2010	116,691	▲0.7%
2011	119,399	▲2.3%
2012	118,320	▼ −0.9%
2013	123,981	▲4.8%
2014	121,913	▼ −1.7%
2015	124,691	▲2.3%
2016	138,909	▲11.4%
2017	157,044	▲13.1%
2018	172,520	▲9.9%
2019	180,562	▲4.7%
2020	67,649	▼ −62.5%
2021	80,608	▲19.2%
2022	130,672	▲62.1%
2023	152,497	▲16.7%
2024	170,403	▲11.7%
2025	187,656	▲10.1%

=== Routes ===
Top 10 scheduled destinations (2025)
Rank	Airport	Passengers	Carriers
1	London-Heathrow, London-Gatwick, London-Luton	1,082,800	British Airways, LOT Polish Airlines, Wizz Air
2	Paris-Charles de Gaulle	687,800	Air France, LOT Polish Airlines, Wizz Air
3	Amsterdam Airport Schiphol	628,500	LOT Polish Airlines, KLM
4	Brussels Airport, Brussels South Charleroi Airport	536,400	LOT Polish Airlines, Brussels Airlines, Ryanair
5	Copenhagen Airport	518,900	LOT Polish Airlines, Scandinavian Airlines, Wizz Air
6	Frankfurt Airport	516,400	LOT Polish Airlines, Lufthansa
7	Rome-Fiumicino	462,700	LOT Polish Airlines, Wizz Air
8	Dubai International Airport	440,400	LOT Polish Airlines, Emirates, flydubai
9	Istanbul Airport	436,700	LOT Polish Airlines, Turkish Airlines
10	Vienna Airport	429,300	LOT Polish Airlines, Austrian Airlines

Top 10 charter destinations (2025)
Rank	Airport	Passengers
1	Antalya	519,800
2	Hurghada	305,500
3	Marsa Alam	228,700
4	Sharm El Sheikh	136,500
5	Rhodes	103,200
6	Heraklion	84,700
7	Bodrum	80,400
8	Djerba	78,800
9	Mallorca	75,400
10	Kos	73,100

== Aviation services ==
Passenger handling, aircraft handling, into-plane fueling and de-icing/anti-icing services are handled by LS Airport Services (LS) or Welcome Airport Services (WAS).

== Ground transportation ==
Warsaw Chopin Airport is located in the south-west part of Warsaw, approximately 10 km (6.21 mi) from the city centre. The airport is easy to access by train, local buses or taxi.

=== Car and taxis ===
Żwirki i Wigury, named after the celebrated aviators who won the Challenge International de Tourisme in 1932, is the main artery leading to the airport.

Taxis to transport arriving passengers from the airport are also available. The taxi providers are ELE Taxi, Uber (since July 2022) and Bolt (since June 2024). However, taxi shortages, queues and prolonged waiting time of up to 30 minutes for Bolt and Uber have been noted at parking lots.

=== Rail ===
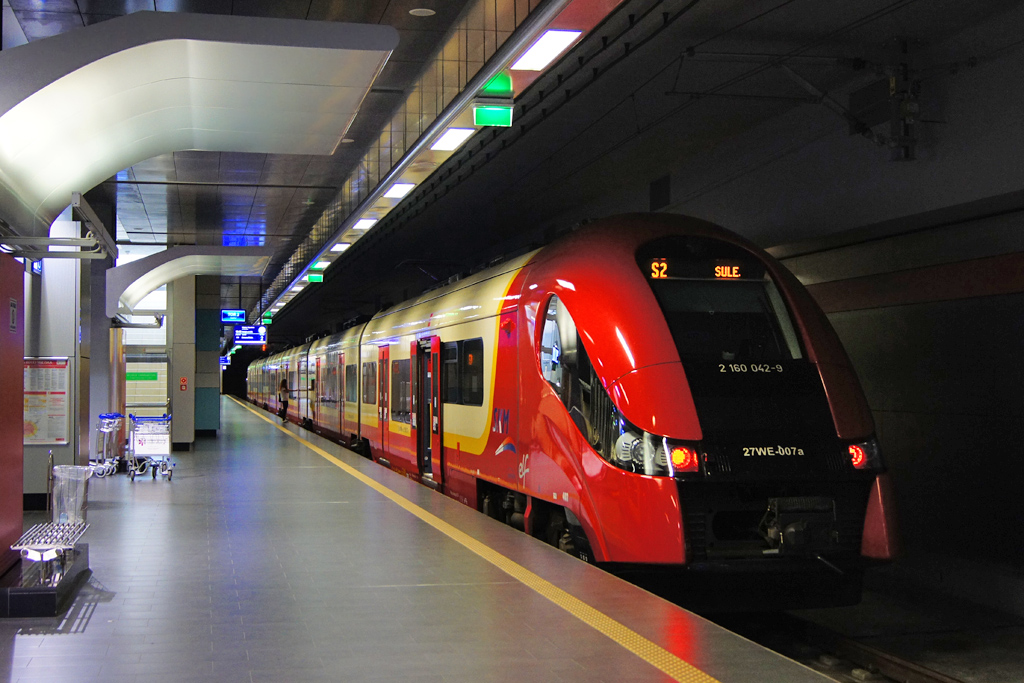
SKM train at Warsaw Chopin Airport railway station

A rail link was built at a cost of 230 million złoty to connect the airport's Warsaw Chopin Airport railway station (built as part of the former Terminal 2) to the Warsaw city center. The station was opened on 1 June 2012, with service starting on the same day. Trains run every 15 minutes. Service to the station is provided by both Szybka Kolej Miejska and Masovian Railways.

On 15 December 2019, a direct rail service was established with the city of Łodź.

=== Bus ===
Warsaw city centre can be reached by the bus lines: 175 and 188 during the day and N32 at night. There is also an additional line 148 that provides access to Ursynów (a southern part of Warsaw) and Praga (an eastern part of Warsaw). Bus 331 connects with the Wilanowska metro station.

Starting 13 July 2026, a direct bus route from Hrodna, Belarus to Warsaw Chopin Airport will start operating.

== Accidents and incidents ==
- On 19 December 1962, a LOT Polish Airlines Vickers Viscount 804 crashed on approach after a flight from Brussels and Berlin-Schönefeld Airport, while attempting a go-around. All 33 passengers on board died.
- On 14 March 1980, LOT Polish Airlines Flight 007, Ilyushin Il-62 aircraft crashed on final approach from New York City's John F. Kennedy International Airport, when attempting a go-around. All 87 passengers and crew members on board were killed, including the entire amateur US boxing team, Polish pop singer Anna Jantar and Alan P. Merriam.
- On 9 May 1987, LOT Polish Airlines Flight 5055, Ilyushin Il-62M took off for a flight to New York city's John F. Kennedy International Airport and returned to Okęcie, after an engine failure. During its approach, the aircraft crashed in a heavily wooded area, short of the runway. All 183 passengers and crew members on board died.
- On 14 September 1993 Lufthansa Flight 2904, Airbus A320-200 overran the runway 11. It was a flight from Frankfurt, Germany. The aircraft departed the runway and rolled 90 metres (300 feet) before it hit the embankment and an LLZ aerial. A fire started and penetrated into the passenger cabin. Two of 70 occupants died in this accident, including the training captain who died on impact and one passenger who was unable to escape because he lost consciousness as a result of the smoke in the cabin.
- On 31 December 1993, LOT Polish Airlines Flight 002, a Boeing 767-300ER arriving from Chicago-O'Hare International Airport, suffered substantial damage after its nose gear collapsed when touching down. There were no fatalities.
- On 1 November 2011, LOT Polish Airlines Flight 16, a Boeing 767-300ER, inbound from Newark Liberty International Airport, safely landed at Warsaw Chopin after a mechanical failure of the landing gear prior to landing. The cockpit crew successfully performed an emergency gear-up landing at the airport with no loss of life or injuries.

== See also ==
- List of airports in Poland
