= Expressway S79 (Poland) =

Road in Poland

Coordinates: 51°43′36″N 21°23′40″E

Expressway S79
- Droga ekspresowa S79

Route information
- Length: 4.8 km (3.0 mi) plus 2 km (1.2 mi) concurrent with Expressway S2

Major junctions
- From: Warszawa–Marynarska junction (Warsaw)
- To: Warszawa–Puławska junction (Warsaw)

Location
- Country: Poland
- Major cities: Warsaw

Highway system
- National roads in Poland; Voivodeship roads
← S 74	→ S 86

Expressway S79 is an expressway in Warsaw acting as a spur route between the southern S2 Expressway section of the Warsaw Express Ring Road at Warszawa Południe junction and Int. Frederic Chopin Airport, ending at the junction with the inner-city Marynarska road. It also acts as a major Warsaw exit route to the S7 Expressway towards Kraków.

The road was completed in September 2013. On a stretch between Warszawa Południe and Warszawa–Puławska junctions, it has concurrency with S2.

== Exit list ==
Country	Voivodeship	Location	km	mi	Exit	Name	Destinations	Notes
Poland	Mazovian Voivodeship	Warsaw	0	0.0	—	Marynarska	DK 79 – ul. Sasanki, Ursus, Centrum ul. Marynarska – Mokotów	Northwestern endpoint of expressway, planned continuation as N-S route Centrum means city centre Kilometrage starting point Access to Marynarska Street (Polish: ulica Marynarska) and Sasanki Street (Polish: ulica Sasanki) There are no signs with the name of the junction
Poland	Mazovian Voivodeship	Warsaw	1.5	0.93	—	Warszawa Okęcie	local road – Warsaw Chopin Airport	There are no signs with the name of the junction
Poland	Mazovian Voivodeship	Warsaw	4.6	2.9	—	Warszawa Lotnisko	S 2 / E30 – Poznań; S 7 – (under construction)	West terminus of common section with S2 S7 under construction
Poland	Mazovian Voivodeship	Warsaw			R12	Puławska	S 2 / E30 – Terespol, Lublin, Wawer; DK 79 – ul. Puławska, Piaseczno, Sandomierz / Ursynów, Mokotów	• Southeast endpoint of the expressway • East terminus of common section with S2 Access to Puławska Street (Polish: ulica Puławska) Exit number of expressway S2
1.000 mi = 1.609 km; 1.000 km = 0.621 mi: Concurrency terminus; Route transition
