= Bolesławów, Otwock County =

Bolesławów
- Village
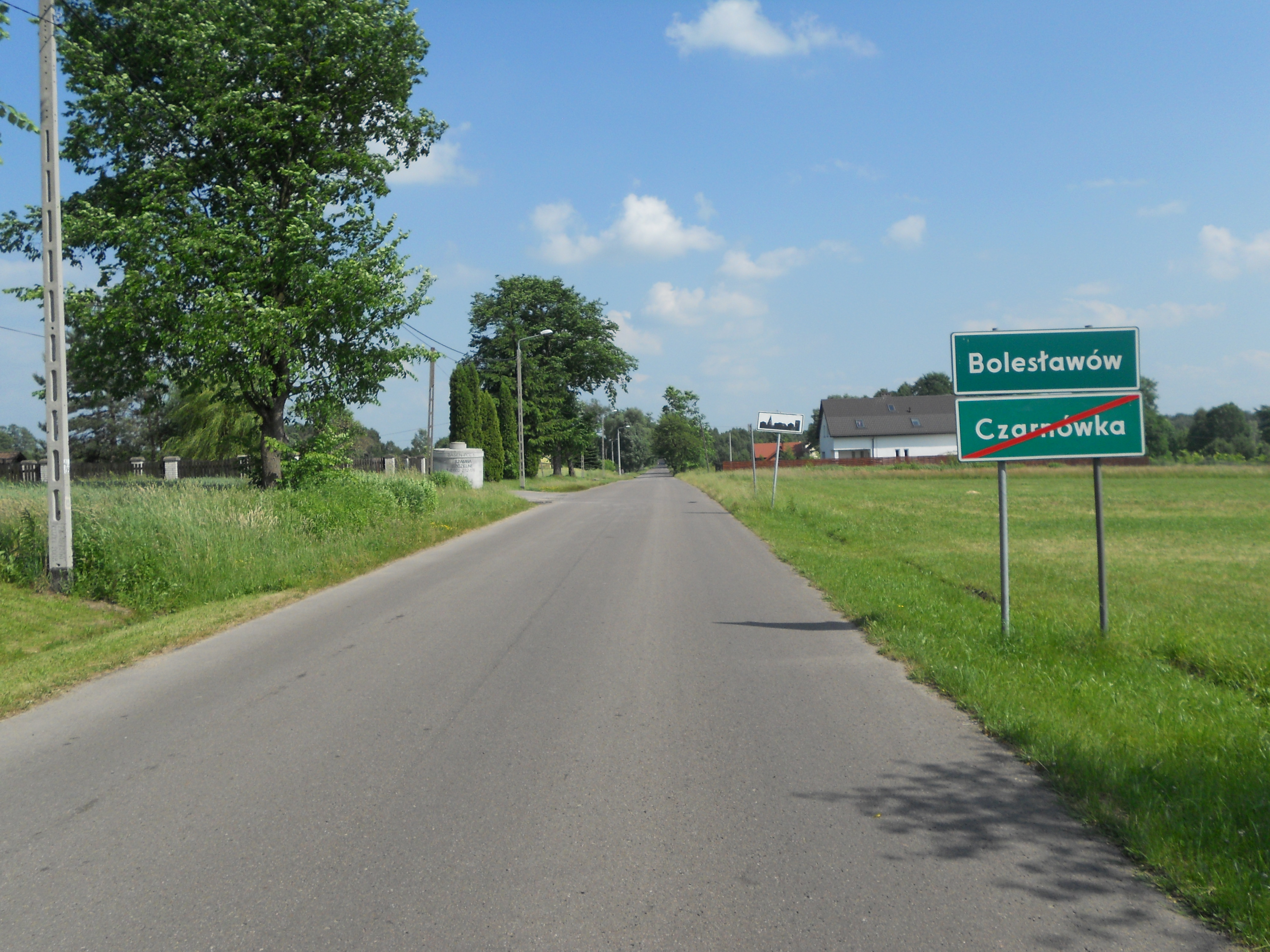

- Location within Poland
- Coordinates: 52°7′20″N 21°26′22″E
- Country: Poland
- Voivodeship: Masovian
- County: Otwock
- Gmina: Wiązowna

Bolesławów [bɔlɛˈswavuf] is a village in the administrative district of Gmina Wiązowna, within Otwock County, Masovian Voivodeship, in east-central Poland.
