= Wola Ducka =

- Village
- Location within Poland
- Coordinates: 52°7′N 21°23′E
- Country: Poland
- Voivodeship: Masovian
- County: Otwock
- Gmina: Wiązowna

Wola Ducka [ˈvɔla ˈdut͡ska] is a village in the administrative district of Gmina Wiązowna, within Otwock County, Masovian Voivodeship, in east-central Poland.
