= Kopki, Masovian Voivodeship =

Kopki
- Village
- Location within Poland
- Coordinates: 52°8′0″N 21°22′42″E
- Country: Poland
- Voivodeship: Masovian
- County: Otwock
- Gmina: Wiązowna

Kopki [ˈkɔpki] is a village in the administrative district of Gmina Wiązowna, within Otwock County, Masovian Voivodeship, in east-central Poland.
