= Expressway S86 (Poland) =

Road in Poland

Coordinates: 50°07′49″N 19°01′30″E

Expressway S86
- Droga ekspresowa S86

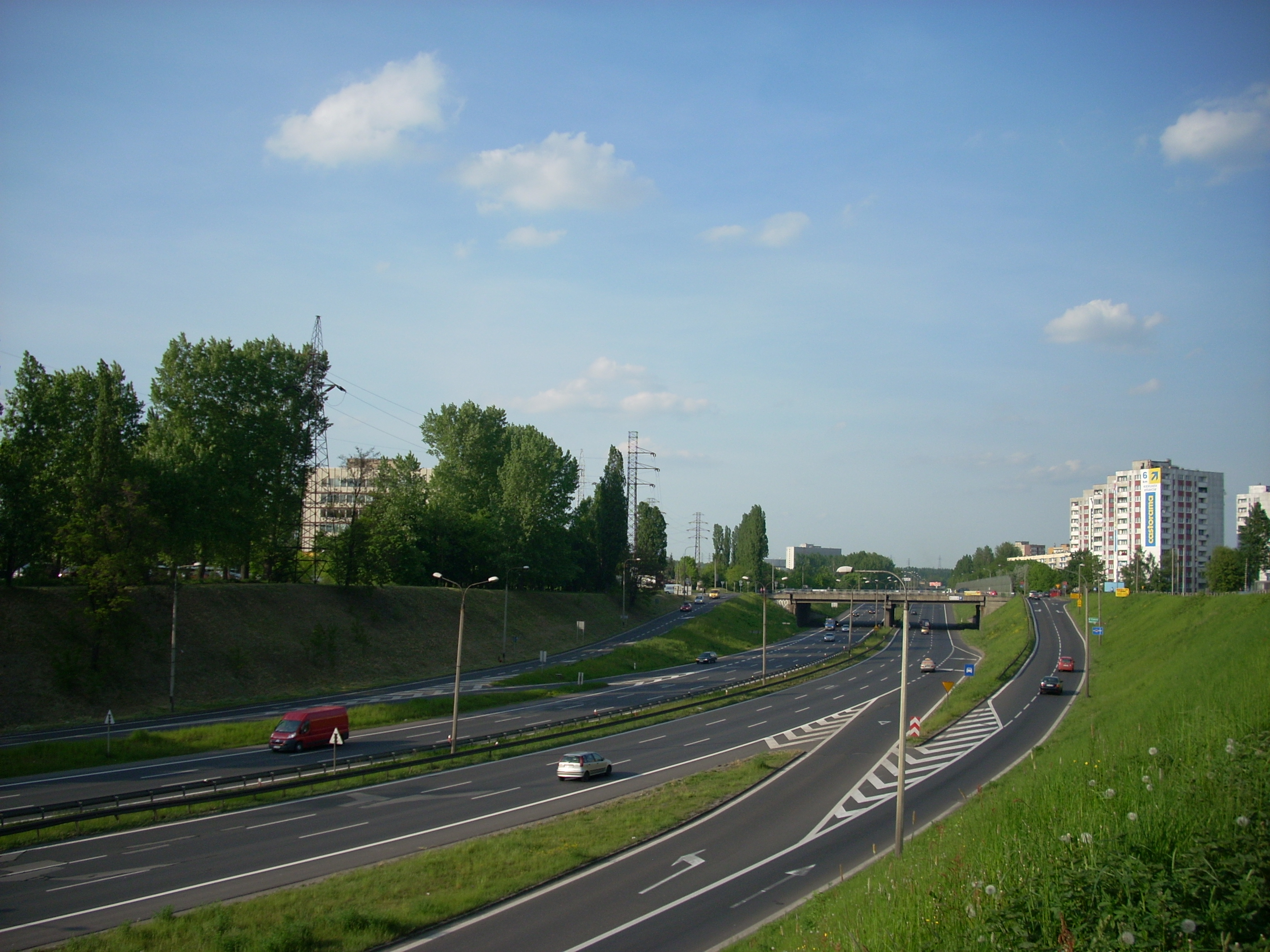
- Express road S86 in Sosnowiec

Route information
- Maintained by GDDKiA
- Length: 5.9 km (3.7 mi)

Major junctions
- From: Sosnowiec
- To: Katowice

Location
- Country: Poland
- Regions: Silesian Voivodeship
- Major cities: Sosnowiec, Katowice

Highway system
- National roads in Poland; Voivodeship roads
| ← S 79 | → S 1 |

Expressway S86 (Polish: Droga ekspresowa S86, abbreviated as S86) – built from 1978 to 1986 section of national road 86 with a length of 5.9 kilometres (3.7 mi), connecting Katowice (Roździeńskiego Avenue, Murckowska Street and Bagienna Street junction) with Sosnowiec (Pogoń junction). In Katowice the road is a part of Walentego Roździeńskiego Avenue. The route has two carriageways, each with three lanes.

In 2010 it was the busiest national road in Poland, and continuously since 2015 it is the second busiest national road in Poland behind the bypass of Warsaw. At the same time it was the expressway with the highest number of traffic collisions and accidents in 2016.

Since 1999 it is maintained by General Directorate for National Roads and Highways (Polish: Generalna Dyrekcja Dróg Krajowych i Autostrad). On September 13, 2015, the government changed the ordinance of the motorways and expressways, officially including the S86 expressway in it, making it the shortest of all expressways in Poland. It is also one of the few expressways that at present time are not connected with the rest of the network of motorways and expressways.

== Traffic ==
Being the main route of traffic between Zagłębie Dąbrowskie and Upper Silesian, part of the Katowice urban area, expressway S86 is a high traffic road, which is known for frequent traffic jams. According to General Traffic Measurement conducted by GDDKiA in 2010, it carries heavy traffic in Poland with an average of 104,339 vehicles daily. From 2015, it has the second heaviest traffic in Poland, following the Warsaw section of expressway S8, with 112,212 vehicles daily and similar numbers in 2020 and beyond. According to General Traffic Measurement maps, the most generated traffic was from Zagłębie cities adjacent to Katowice: Sosnowiec, Czeladź, Będzin, but 80% of that traffic consists of passenger cars.

According to University of Economics in Katowice professor Robert Tomanek, 100,000 vehicles daily limits the road's capacity. He points out that the widening of the route is impossible due to the neighboring buildings. It is one of the three expressways in Poland on which the traffic movement freedom index (Polish: poziom swobody ruchu, PSR) in 2017 was classified as the lowest one, with a C mark). Professor Jerzy Runge at University of Silesia connects the excessive traffic load on the route with the polycentric model of the labor market in the region, where Katowice clearly dominates the local market, which had redirected the stream of people moving towards Katowice from adjacent cities. People are eight times more likely to travel from Sosnowiec to Katowice for work than in the opposite direction, which is a record on a national scale. On a working day, according to KZK GOP (Polish: Komunikacyjny Związek Komunalny Górnośląskiego Okręgu Przemysłowego), 44,000 people travel by buses running via S86 from Sosnowiec and Dąbrowa, 32,000 on weekends. The bottleneck at the connection with National Road 79 leading from Mysłowice is also indicated as the cause of road congestion.

== Alternative connections ==
Because of the impossible to be resolved problems with road's capacity and traffic characteristics, where the basis is local traffic related to commuting to work, ways of redirecting part of the traffic to alternative transport are being sought.

=== Public transport ===
The public transport between Sosnowiec and Katowice is assessed as poor. The bus lines do not make an alternative, because they run on S86 and the excessive traffic makes significant delays of buses at the times of the heaviest passenger load. Bus line 15 has an alternative route, but is criticized for the travel time and costs, which make it much less attractive than transport by car.

=== Fast tram ===
In 2017, there was a concept of building a second, faster than line 15, tram connection between Sosnowiec and Katowice, which would run parallel to S86. However, in 2020 the project was stuck at the level of selecting the company that would prepare a design study for Tramwaje Śląskie.

=== Bus lanes ===
In 2022, Kazimierz Karolczak, the chairman of the Metropolis GZM board, suggested creation of bus lanes on S86. Earlier, in 2018, the same concept was proposed by Arkadiusz Chęciński, president of Sosnowiec. The idea was rejected by GDDKiA as impossible for realization, mostly because of the road's capacity, "bottleneck" on junction with road 79 and the expressway status.

=== Bicycle routes and bicycle highways ===
Katowice do not have a consistent, uniform connection with Sosnowiec by bike paths and the system of planned bike ways do not guarantee the fastest connection of the cities. In 2016, a concept of building fast bike way from Sosnowiec to Katowice on the former route of sand railway emerged. In 2019, thanks to Metropolis GZM, the concept took on the actual shape of velostrada, with the route parallel to S86 as an alternative connection that allows to travel by bicycle in 25–30 minutes, and by electric bicycle and e-scooter even in 20 minutes.

== Traffic accidents and collisions ==
Among the expressways, S86 is in the first place as the most dangerous road in Poland: on average, 113 collisions and accidents were reported per 1 km of road in almost entire year, which gives an average of almost 2 collisions daily for the entire 5.9 kilometres (3.7 mi) stretch. In 2016, 599 collisions and accidents occurred there, which was the highest result for all of roads in Katowice.

An important factor mentioned in connection with the collision on the S86 route is the fact that any collision on this route can paralyze the region.

== Bibliography ==
- S. Adamczyk (red.) (1993), Katowice - Informator (in Polish), Katowice: Urząd Miasta w Katowicach
- Katowice - Plan miasta (in Polish), Warszawa: Demart SA, 2009–2010
