= Wola Karczewska =

- Village
- Location within Poland
- Coordinates: 52°8′N 21°23′E
- Country: Poland
- Voivodeship: Masovian
- County: Otwock
- Gmina: Wiązowna
- Website: http://www.wolakarczewska.pl

Wola Karczewska [ˈvɔla karˈt͡ʂɛfska] is a village in the administrative district of Gmina Wiązowna, within Otwock County, Masovian Voivodeship, in east-central Poland.
