= Michałówek, Otwock County =

Michałówek
- Village
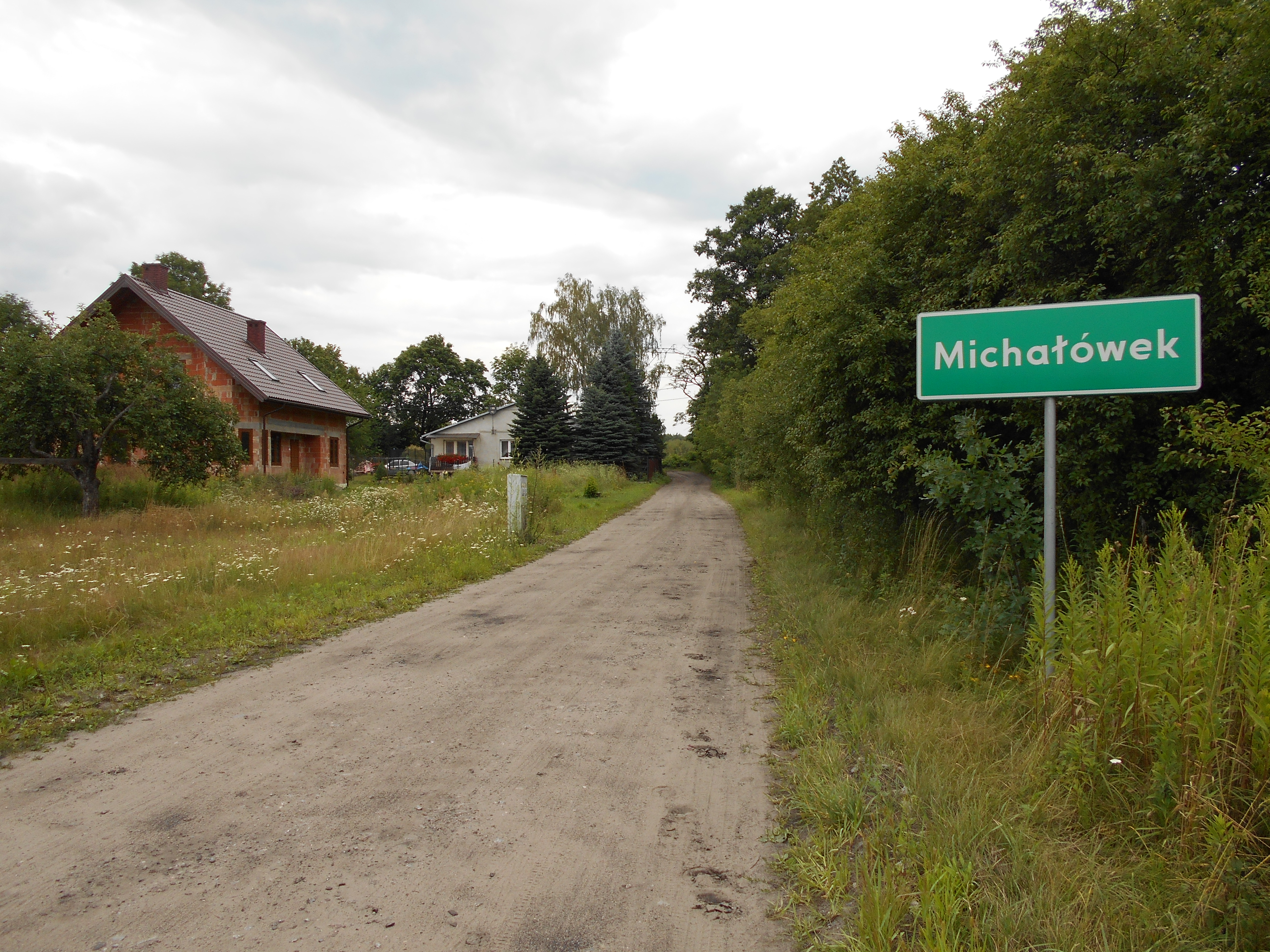
- Road sign in Michałówek

- Location within Poland
- Coordinates: 52°12′11″N 21°18′21″E
- Country: Poland
- Voivodeship: Masovian
- County: Otwock
- Gmina: Wiązowna

Michałówek [mixaˈwuvɛk] is a village in the administrative district of Gmina Wiązowna, within Otwock County, Masovian Voivodeship, in east-central Poland.
