= Malcanów, Masovian Voivodeship =

Malcanów
- Village
- Location within Poland
- Coordinates: 52°8′53″N 21°22′25″E
- Country: Poland
- Voivodeship: Masovian
- County: Otwock
- Gmina: Wiązowna

Malcanów [malˈt͡sanuf] is a village in the administrative district of Gmina Wiązowna, within Otwock County, Masovian Voivodeship, in east-central Poland.
