= Dziechciniec =

- Village
- Location within Poland
- Coordinates: 52°9′N 21°21′E
- Country: Poland
- Voivodeship: Masovian
- County: Otwock
- Gmina: Wiązowna
- Population: 400
- Website: http://www.dziechciniec.com

Dziechciniec [d͡ʑɛxˈt͡ɕiɲɛt͡s] is a village in the administrative district of Gmina Wiązowna, within Otwock County, Masovian Voivodeship, in east-central Poland.
