= Duchnów =

- Village
- Location within Poland
- Coordinates: 52°11′N 21°21′E
- Country: Poland
- Voivodeship: Masovian
- County: Otwock
- Gmina: Wiązowna
- Population (2021): 788
- Time zone: UTC+1 (CET)
  - Summer (DST): UTC+2 (CEST)
- Postal code: 05-462
- Telephone code: 22
- Vehicle registration: WOT
- SIMC: 0009917

Duchnów [ˈduxnuf] is a village in the administrative district of Gmina Wiązowna, within Otwock County, Masovian Voivodeship, in east-central Poland.
