= Poręby, Otwock County =

Poręby
- Village
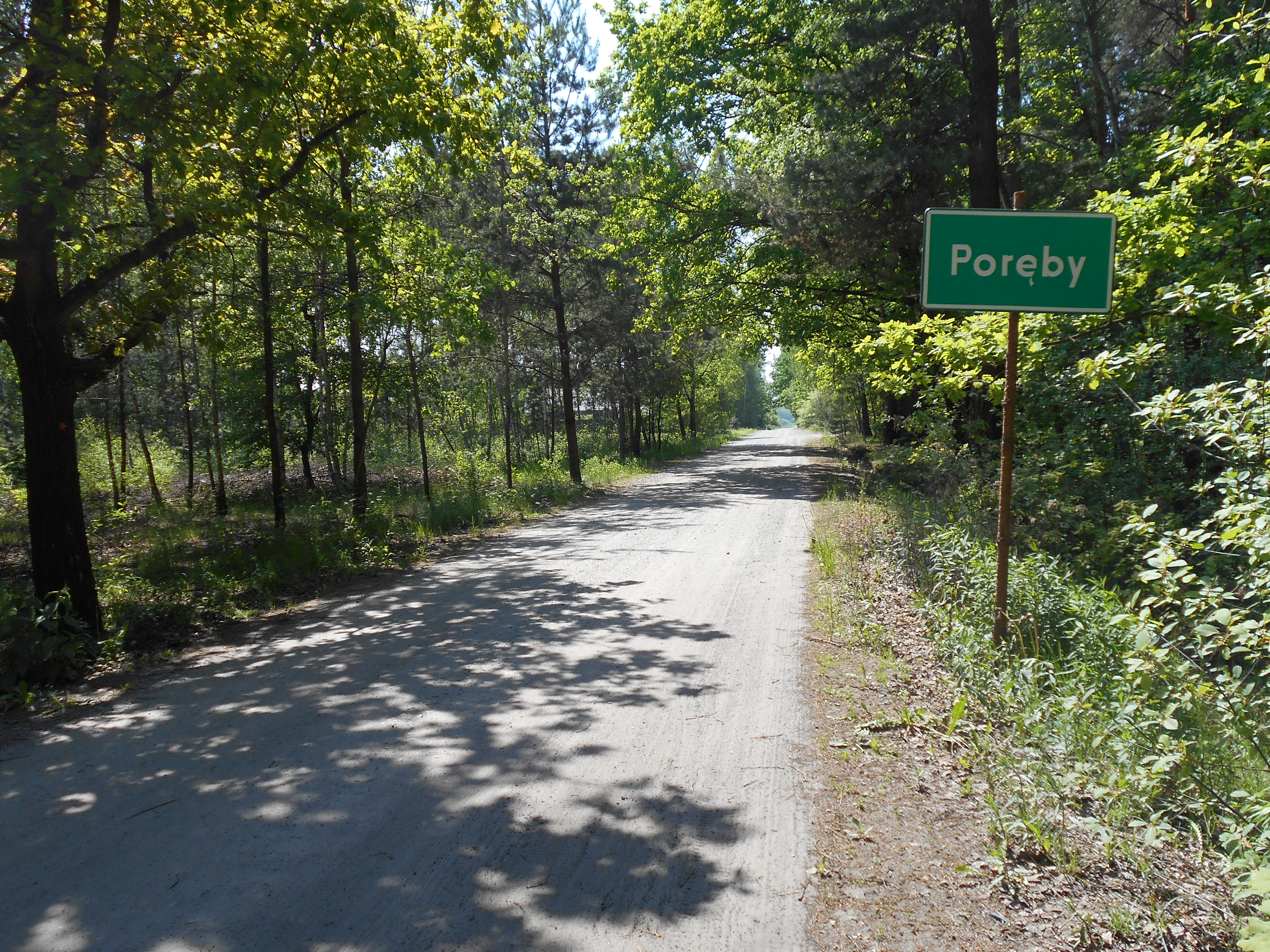
- Street and road sign of Poręby

- Location within Poland
- Coordinates: 52°09′35″N 21°25′10″E
- Country: Poland
- Voivodeship: Masovian
- County: Otwock
- Gmina: Wiązowna

Poręby [pɔˈrɛmbɨ] is a village in the administrative district of Gmina Wiązowna, within Otwock County, Masovian Voivodeship, in east-central Poland.
