= Czarnówka, Masovian Voivodeship =

Czarnówka
- Village
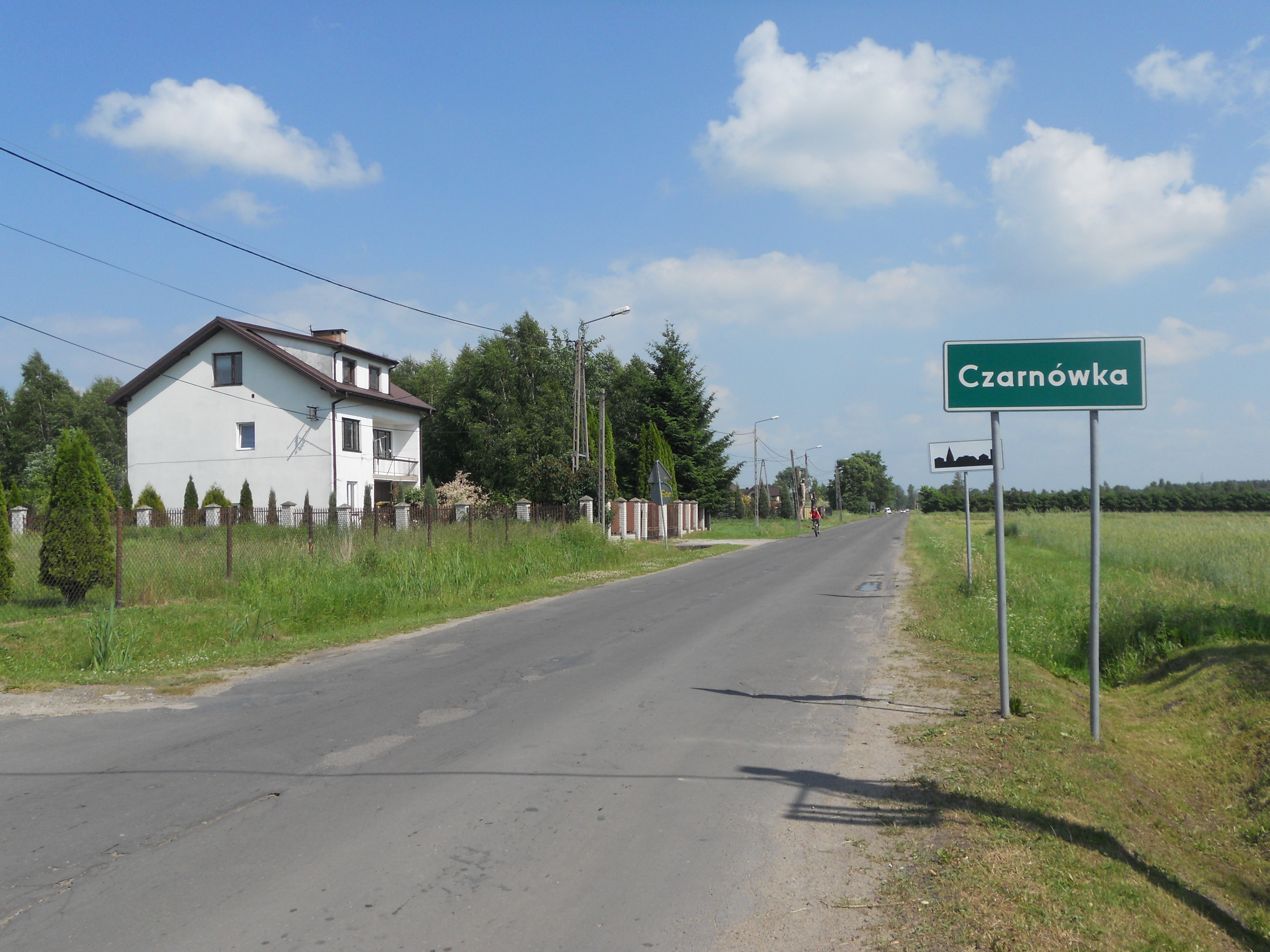
- Road sign in Czarnówka

- Location within Poland
- Coordinates: 52°07′36″N 21°25′33″E
- Country: Poland
- Voivodeship: Masovian
- County: Otwock
- Gmina: Wiązowna

Czarnówka [t͡ʂarˈnufka] is a village in the administrative district of Gmina Wiązowna, within Otwock County, Masovian Voivodeship, in east-central Poland.
