= Góraszka =

- Village
- Location within Poland
- Coordinates: 52°11′N 21°17′E
- Country: Poland
- Voivodeship: Masovian
- County: Otwock
- Gmina: Wiązowna

Góraszka [ɡuˈraʂka] is a village in the administrative district of Gmina Wiązowna, within Otwock County, Masovian Voivodeship, in east-central Poland.

The village is near national road no. 17 (Warsaw-Lublin). It has an airfield where the Polish Eagles Foundation has held an "International Air Picnic" every year since 1996.
