= Zagórze, Otwock County =

Zagórze
- Village
- Location within Poland
- Coordinates: 52°11′54″N 21°15′01″E
- Country: Poland
- Voivodeship: Masovian
- County: Otwock
- Gmina: Wiązowna

Zagórze [zaˈɡuʐɛ] is a village in the administrative district of Gmina Wiązowna, within Otwock County, Masovian Voivodeship, in east-central Poland.
