= Izabela, Masovian Voivodeship =

Izabela
- Village
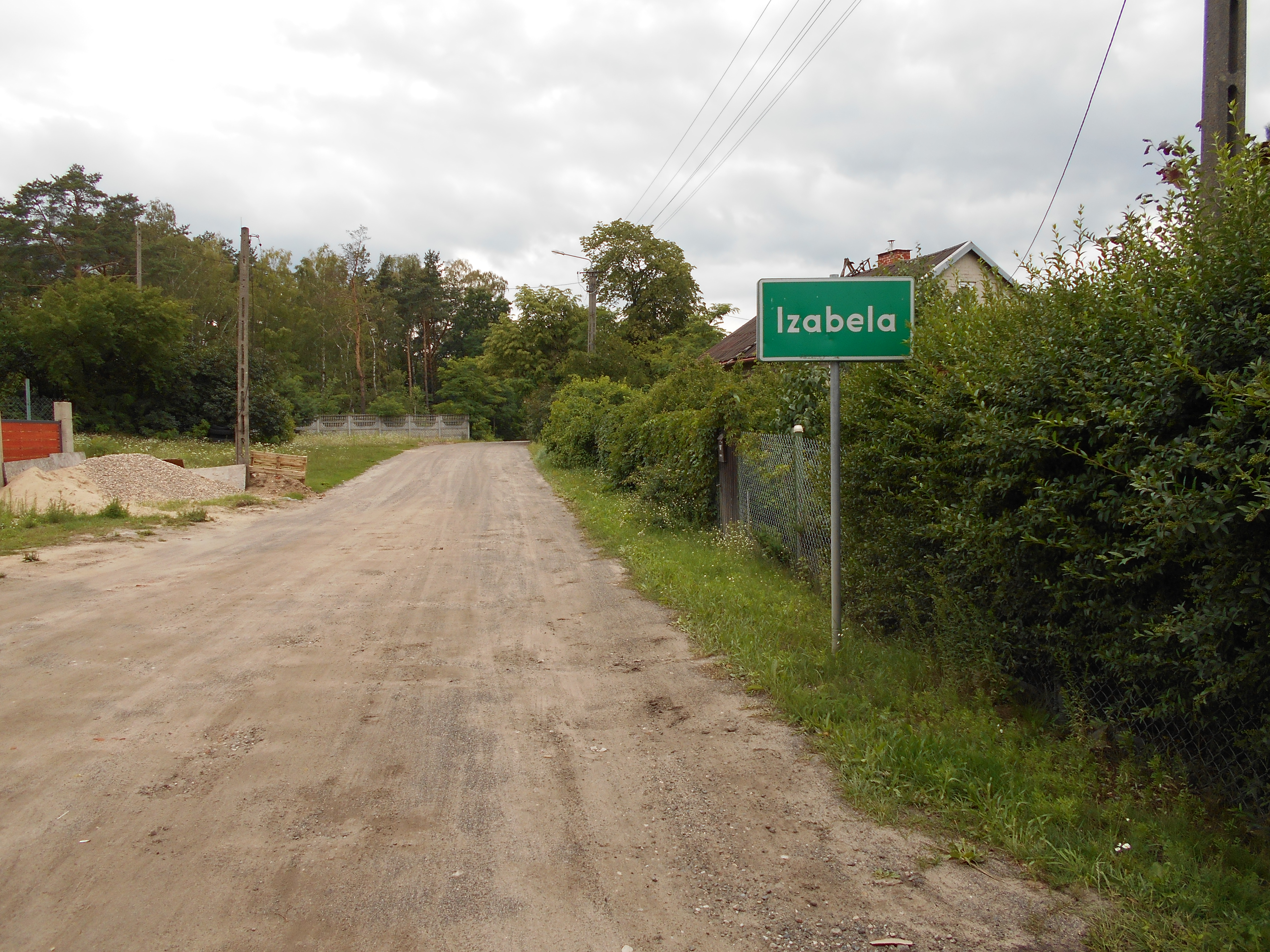
- Street of Izabela, Masovian Voivodeship

- Location within Poland
- Coordinates: 52°12′25″N 21°17′33″E
- Country: Poland
- Voivodeship: Masovian
- County: Otwock
- Gmina: Wiązowna

Izabela [izaˈbɛla] is a village in the administrative district of Gmina Wiązowna, within Otwock County, Masovian Voivodeship, in east-central Poland.
