= Majdan, Otwock County =

Majdan
- Village
- Location within Poland
- Coordinates: 52°12′11″N 21°16′6″E
- Country: Poland
- Voivodeship: Masovian
- County: Otwock
- Gmina: Wiązowna

Majdan (Polish pronunciation: [ˈmajdan]) is a village in the administrative district of Gmina Wiązowna, within Otwock County, Masovian Voivodeship, in east-central Poland.
