= Transport in Poland =

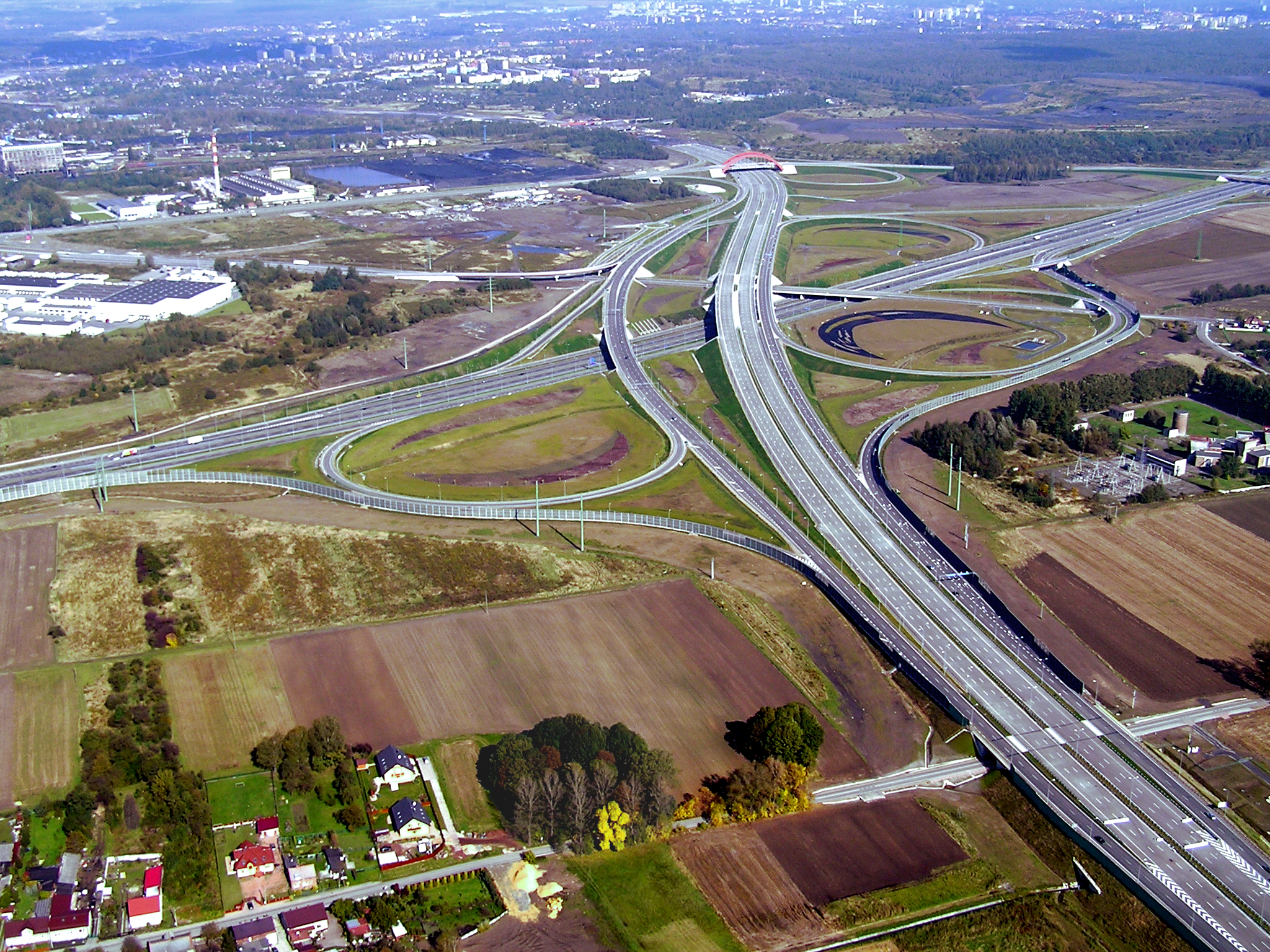
A1, A4 motorways and national road 44 junction near Gliwice

Transport in Poland involves air, water, road and rail transportation. The country has a large network of municipal public transport, such as buses, trams and the metro. As a country located at the 'cross-roads' of Europe, Poland is a nation with a large and increasingly modern network of transport infrastructure.

The country's most important waterway is the Vistula river. The largest seaports are the Port of Gdańsk, the Port of Gdynia and the Port of Szczecin. Air travel is generally used for international travel, with many flights originating at Warsaw Chopin Airport. Railways connect all of Poland's major cities and the state-owned Polish State Railways (PKP) corporation, through its subsidiaries, runs a great number of domestic and international services of varying speed and comfort. In addition to this, five out of sixteen Polish voivodeships have their own regional rail service providers.

== Rail transport ==
Railways in Poland

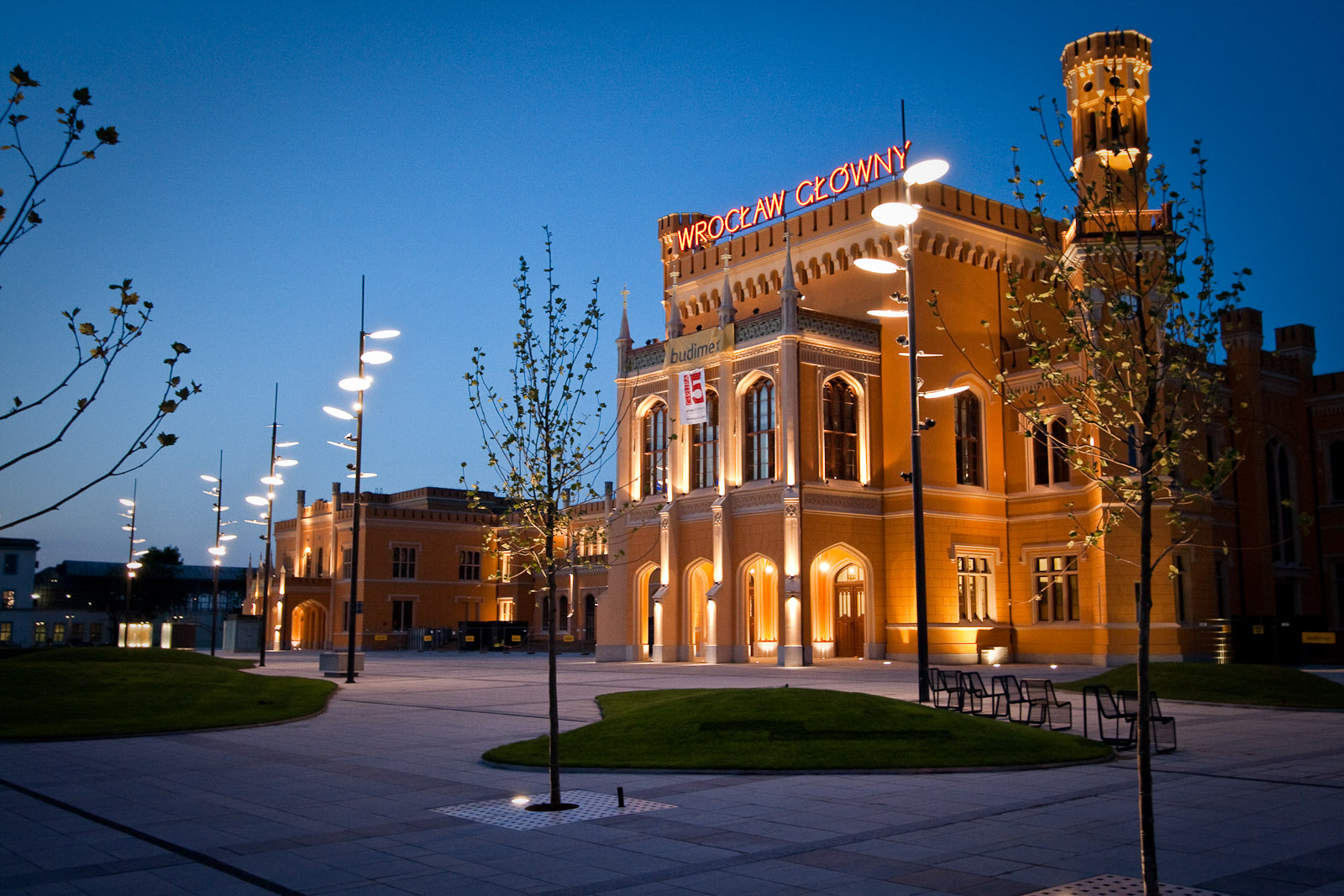
Wrocław Główny railway station, the busiest train station in Poland.

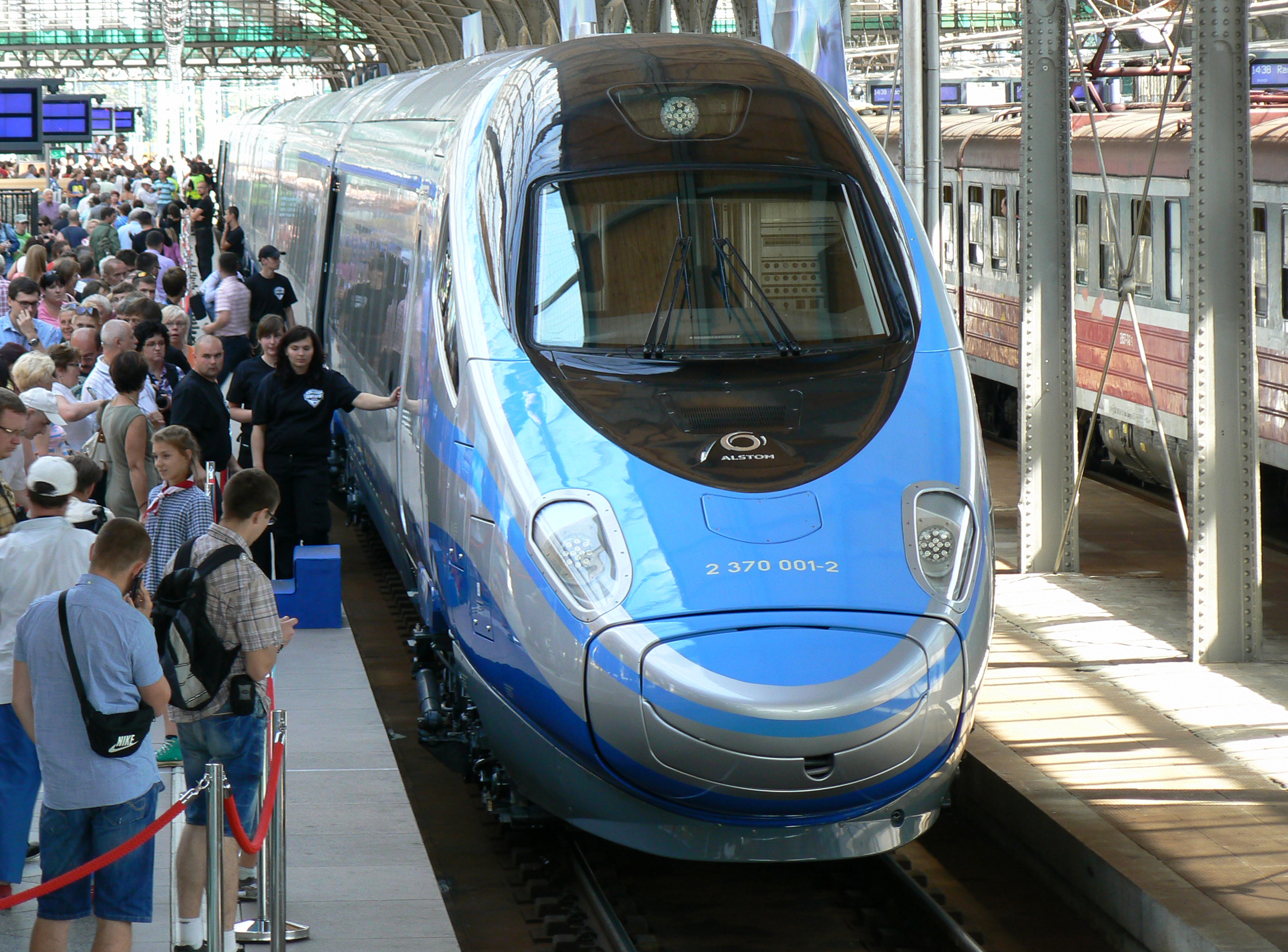
A PKP Intercity ED250 Pendolino at Wrocław Main Station.

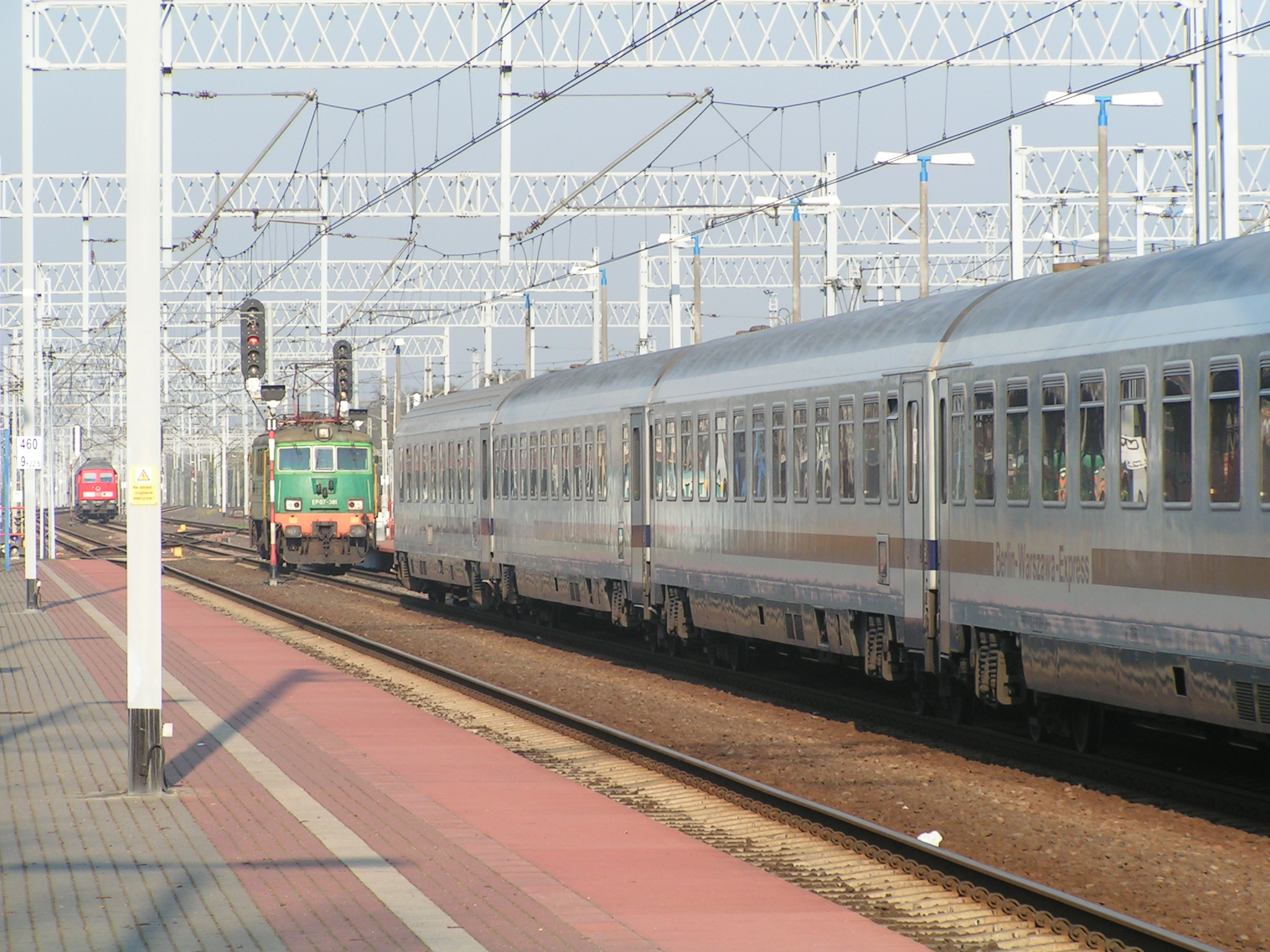
A Polish locomotive takes over haulage duty from a Deutsche Bahn unit at Rzepin on a Berlin-Warsaw Express train

Poland is served by an extensive network of railways. In most cities the main railway station is located near a city centre and is well connected to the local transportation system. The infrastructure is operated by PKP Group. The rail network is very dense in western and northern Poland, while eastern part of the country is less developed. The capital city, Warsaw, has the country's only rapid transit system: the Warsaw Metro. The PKP Group is the fourth largest railway operator throughout Europe.

The only high-speed rail line (though by most definitions, real high-speed rail only includes speeds over 200 km/h) in central-eastern Europe is the Central Rail Line (Poland), Centralna Magistrala Kolejowa (CMK). It has a length of 223 km (139 mi), and was built in 1971–1977; it links Warsaw with Kraków and Katowice. Most trains on the CMK operate at speeds up to 160 km/h (99 mph), but since December 2014 new Alstom Pendolino ED250 trains operate on a 90 km section of the CMK at 200 km/h (124 mph), and improvements under way should raise the authorized speed to 200 km/h (124 mph) on most of the line. In test runs on the CMK in November 2013 a new Pendolino ED250 train set a new Polish speed record of 293 km/h (182 mph).

The Warsaw-Gdańsk-Gdynia high-speed railway route is undergoing a major upgrade costing $3 billion, and is partly funded by the European Investment Bank. The investments include track replacement, realignment of curves and relocation of sections of track to allow speeds up to 200 km/h (124 mph), modernization of stations, and installation of the most modern ETCS signalling system. In December 2014, new Alstom Pendolino ED250 high-speed trains were put into service between Gdańsk, Warsaw, Katowice and Kraków reducing the rail travel time from Gdańsk to Warsaw to 2 hours 58 minutes, to be reduced in late 2015 to 2 hours 37 minutes.

Other high-speed Polish lines include Warsaw–Kutno–Poznań–(Berlin) (160 km/h), Warsaw–Siedlce–Terespol–(Minsk) (160, 120 km/h) – being upgraded to 160 km/h, Warsaw–Puławy–Lublin (120, 140 km/h) and Opole–Wrocław (160 km/h). The Warsaw–Łódź line is being upgraded to allow speed up to 160 km/h (in order to bind together the Warsaw–Łódź agglomeration).

Plans were made to construct a new high-speed line (350 km/h) from Warsaw to Poznań and Wrocław with forks in Łódź and Kalisz., but the project was cancelled in November 2011 due to its high cost.

=== Passenger transport operators ===
PKP Intercity is the leading operator of express, intercity, eurocity, hotel and TLK trains across Poland. Polregio fills the regional market, with its subsidiary Interregio operating long-distance trains.

Regional operators include Silesian Railways (Silesia). In Poland's capital Warsaw, Masovian Railways serves Mazovia and is centered on Warsaw, Rapid Urban Railway (Warsaw) serves the wider agglomeration and Warszawska Kolej Dojazdowa serves suburban traffic. Other operators include Arriva RP, Lower Silesian Railways, Szybka Kolej Miejska (Tricity) and the commuter rail Łódź Agglomeration Railway in Łódź Voivodeship.

==== Narrow-gauge railways ====
There are hundreds of kilometres of 600 mm (1 ft 11 5/8 in), 750 mm (2 ft 5 1/2 in), 785 mm (2 ft 6 29/32 in), and 1,000 mm (3 ft 3 3/8 in) narrow-gauge lines in Poland. These railways are mostly in decline, some survive as a museum or tourist railways.

=== Freight transport market ===
- PKP Cargo
- PKP LHS – Metallurgic broad-gauge line
- PTK Holding SA – The railway transportation holding in Zabrze
- Przedsiębiorstwo Transportu Kolejowego i Gospodarki Kamieniem Rybnik – The Railway Transport and Stone Management Company in Rybnik
- CTL Logistics
- PCC Rail Szczakowa – Rail Szczakowa website – part of the German concern PCC AG
- Kopalnia Piasku Kotlarnia – The Kotlarnia sand mine
- Kopalnia Piasku Kuźnica Warężyńska – The Kuźnica Warężyńska sand mine
- Orlen KolTrans
- Lotos Kolej
- Nadwiślanski Zakład Transportu Kolejowego- Vistula Rail Transport Company]

==== Broad-gauge railways ====
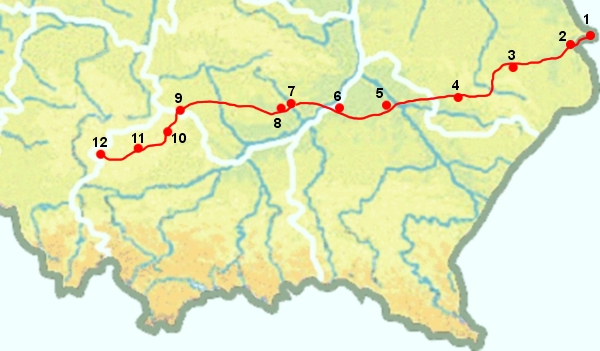
LHS links southern Poland with broad-gauge railways in Ukraine and other eastern countries

Except for Linia Hutnicza Szerokotorowa, and a few very short stretches near border crossings, Poland uses the standard gauge for its railways. Therefore, Linia Hutnicza Szerokotorowa (known by its acronym LHS, English: Broad-gauge steelworks line) in Sławków is the longest broad-gauge railway line in Poland. The line runs on a single track for almost 400 km (250 mi) from the Polish-Ukrainian border, crossing it just east of Hrubieszów. It is the westernmost broad-gauge railway line in Europe that is connected to the broad-gauge rail system of the countries of the former Soviet Union.

=== Rail system ===
Total: 23,420 km (14,550 mi)

- standard gauge 1,435 mm (4 ft 8 1/2 in) : 21,639 km (13,450 mi) (11,626 km (7,220 mi) electrified; 12,236 km (7,600 mi) double track)
- broad gauge 1,520 mm (4 ft 11 27/32 in) : 646 km (401 mi)
- narrow gauge (various) : 1,135 km (710 mi) various gauges including 1,000 mm (3 ft 3 3/8 in), 785 mm (2 ft 6 29/32 in), 750 mm (2 ft 5 1/2 in), and 600 mm (1 ft 11 5/8 in) (1998)

As of December 2002 narrow-gauge railways were no longer owned or operated by PKP. They were transferred to regional authorities or became independent companies.

==== Rail links with adjacent countries ====
- Same gauge:
  - Czech Republic
  - Germany
  - Slovakia
- Break-of-gauge – 1,435 mm (4 ft 8 1/2 in)/1,520 mm (4 ft 11 27/32 in)
  - Lithuania
  - Belarus
  - Russia (Kaliningrad Oblast)
  - Ukraine

== Road transport ==
Map of planned motorway and expressway network in Poland.

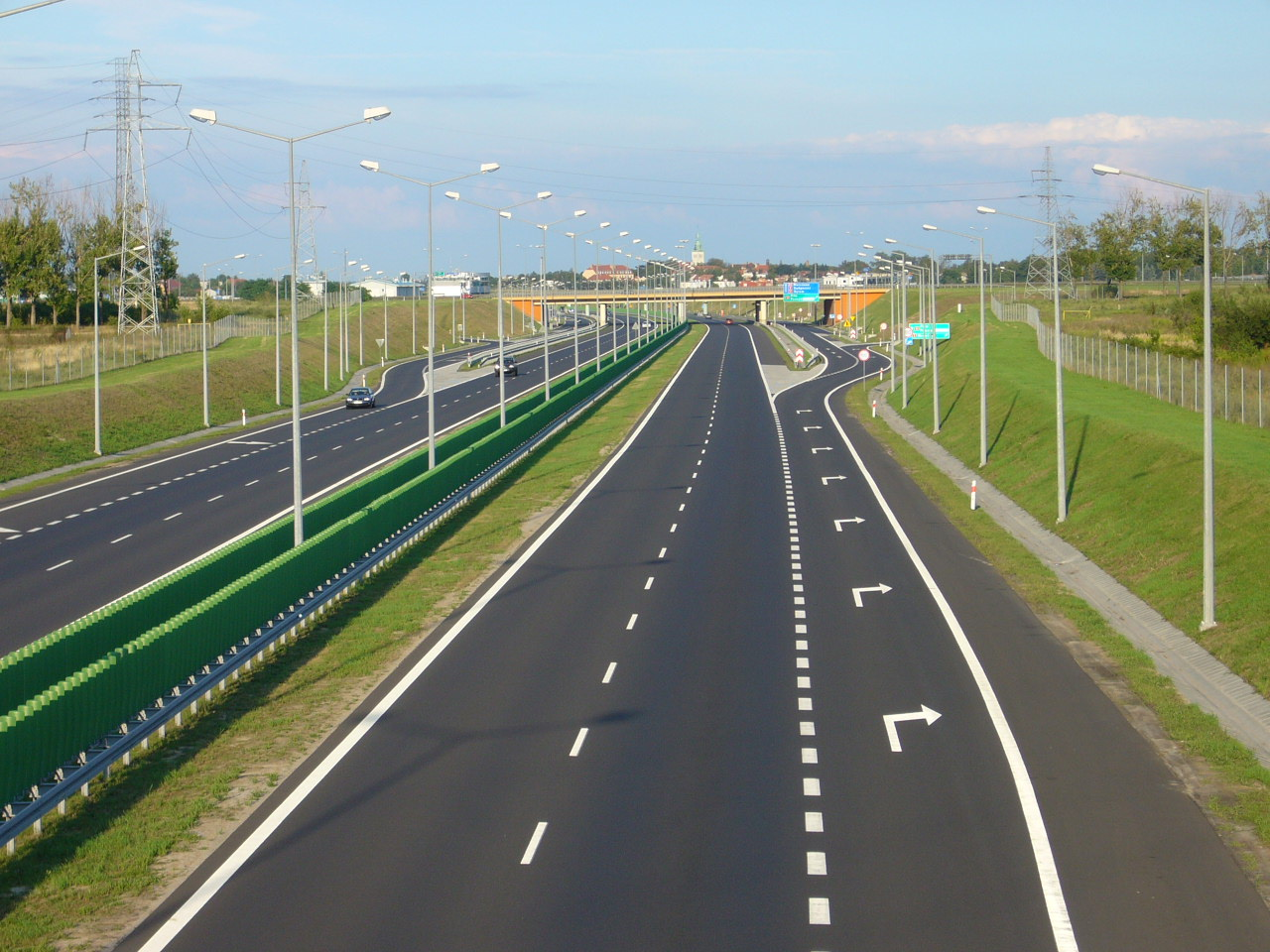
A2 near Poznań, opened in 2003

Semi-trailer truck average daily traffic in 2015

Polish public roads are grouped into categories related to administrative division. Poland has 424,563 km (263,810 mi) of public roads, of which 120,563 km (74,910 mi) are unsurfaced (2021):

- National roads (Technical classes A, S, GP and exceptionally G): 19,403 km (12,060 mi), 1.9 km (1 mi) unsurfaced
- Voivodeship roads (Classes G, Z and exceptionally GP): 28,924 km (17,970 mi), 63.2 km (39 mi) unsurfaced
- Powiat roads (Classes G, Z and exceptionally L): 124,572 km (77,410 mi), 11,379 km (7,070 mi) unsurfaced
- Gmina roads (Classes L, D and exceptionally Z): 251,664 km (156,380 mi), 120,419 km (74,820 mi) unsurfaced

In recent years, the network has been improving and government spending on road construction recently saw a huge increase, due to rapid development of the country and the inflow of European Union funds for infrastructure projects.

=== Motorways and expressways ===
Polish motorways and expressways are part of national roads network. As of December 2021, there are 1,721 kilometres (1,070 mi) of motorways (autostrady, singular - autostrada) and 2,790 km (1,730 mi) of expressways (drogi ekspresowe, singular - droga ekspresowa).

Motorways in Poland, 1,721 km (1,070 mi) (2021):
A1 | A2 | A4 | A6 | A8 | A18

Expressways in Poland, 2,790 km (1,730 mi) (2021):
S1 | S2 | S3 | S5 | S6 | S7 | S8 | S10 | S11 | S12 | S14 | S16 | S17 | S19 | S22 | S51 | S52 | S61 | S74 | S79 | S86

== Air transport ==
Location of main airports in Poland, with number of passengers served in 2016

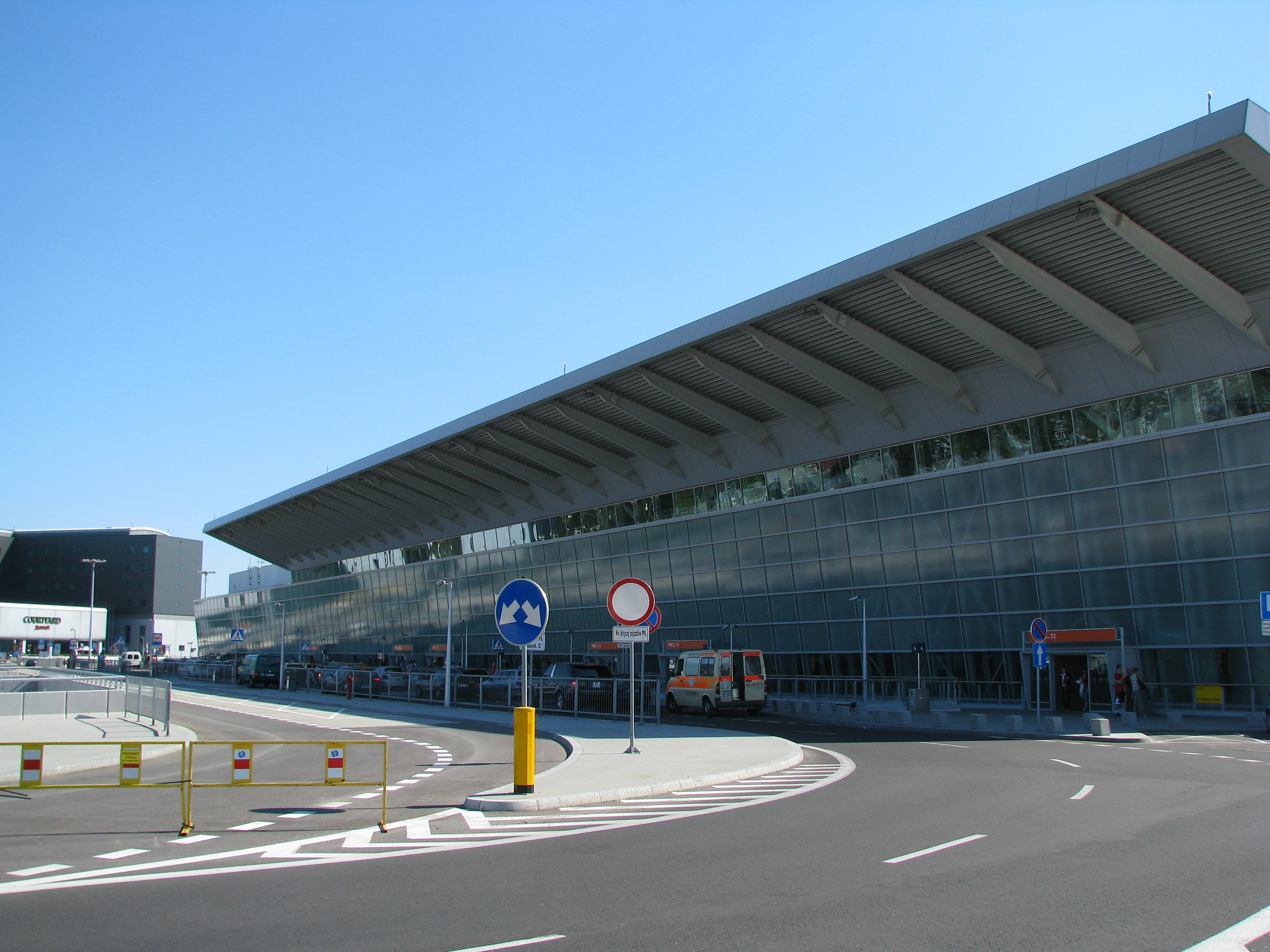
Terminal 2 of the Warsaw Chopin Airport

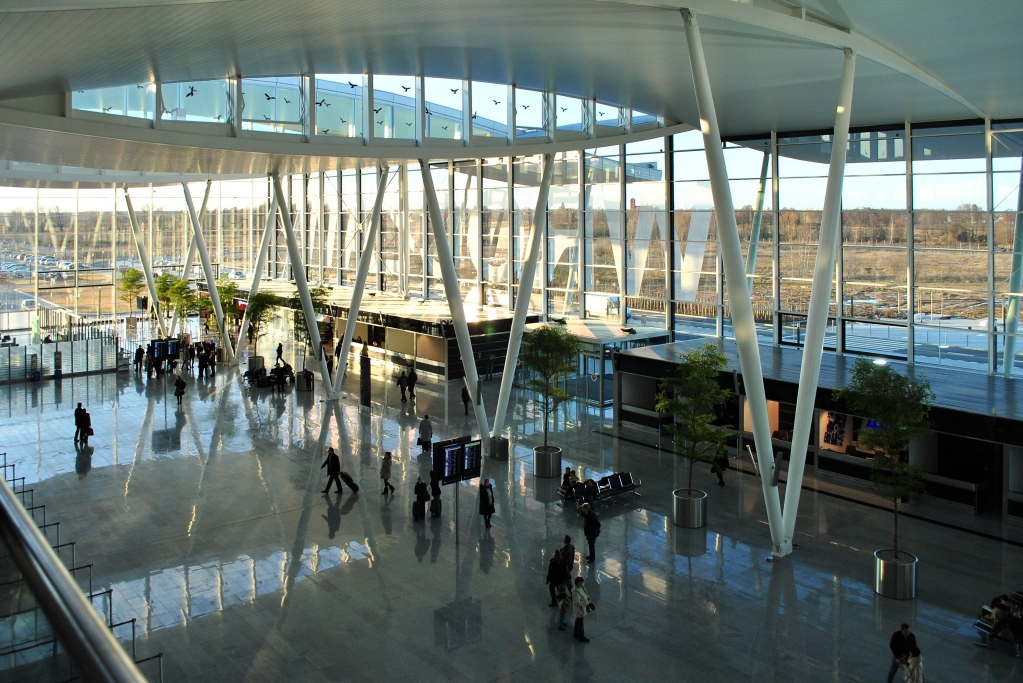
Wrocław Airport - interior of the terminal T2

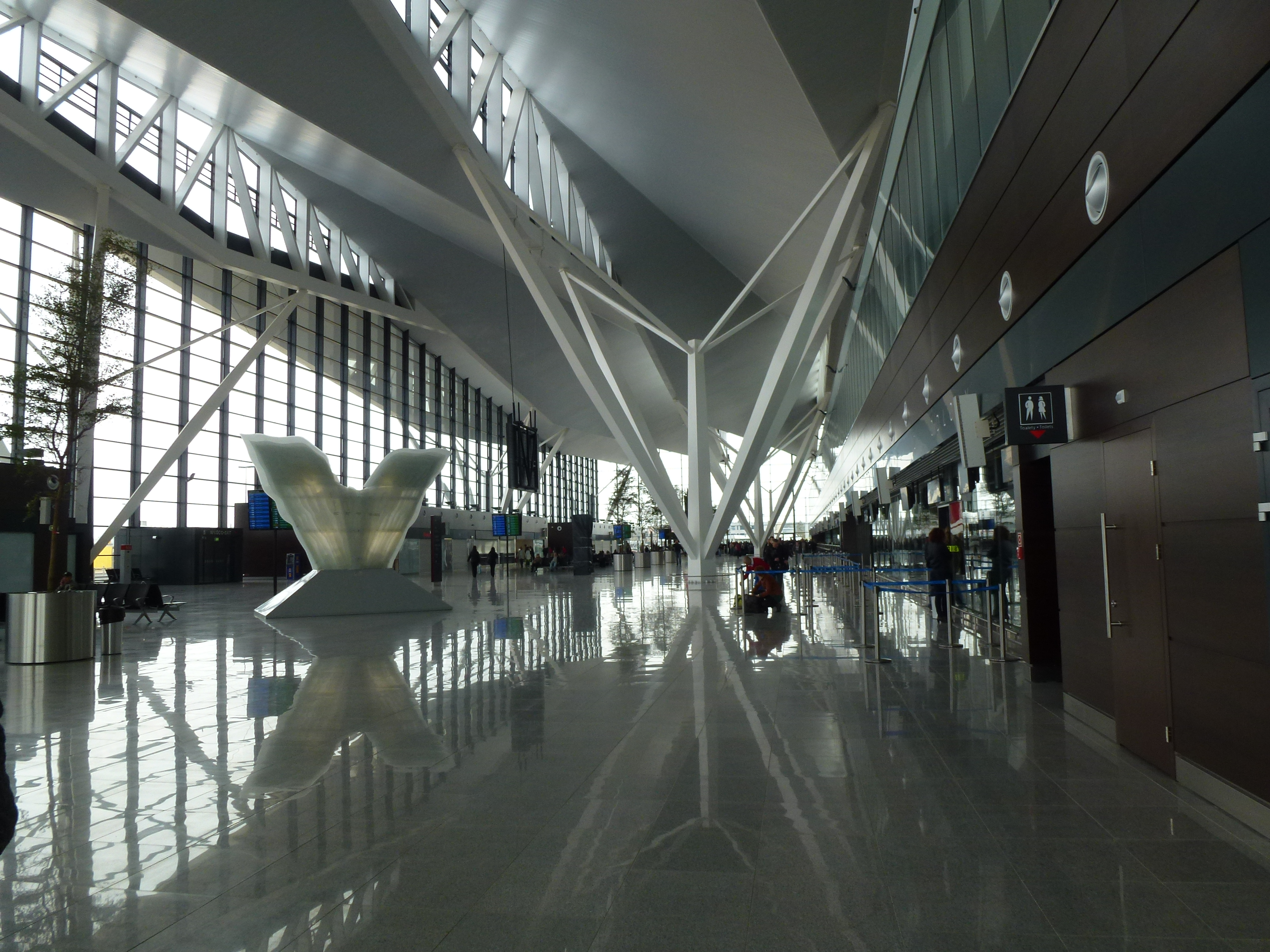
New terminal at Gdańsk Lech Wałęsa Airport

The most important airport in Poland is Warsaw 'Frederic Chopin' International Airport. Warsaw's airport is the main international hub for LOT Polish Airlines.

In addition to Warsaw Chopin, Wrocław, Gdańsk, Katowice, Kraków and Poznań all have international airports.

In preparation for the Euro 2012 football championships jointly hosted by Poland and Ukraine, a number of airports around the country were renovated and redeveloped. This included the building of new terminals with an increased number of jetways and stands at both Wrocław Airport and Lech Wałęsa Airport in Gdańsk.

=== Airlines ===
There are a total of 8 Polish airline companies currently operating, with the most successful airline being LOT Polish Airlines, the flag carrier of Poland. It is also the only regularly scheduled airline in Poland.

6 of the airlines are chartered airlines, including Buzz, Enter Air, LOT Charters, Skytaxi, SprintAir, and Smartwings Poland. SprintAir Cargo is also the main cargo airline in Poland.

=== Airports ===
The Polish airline market was until 2004 a closed market, with bilateral agreements between countries served from the national hub – Warsaw. The regional airports were mostly serving as spokes, and were controlled by PPL, the state-owned airport authority. However, in the 1990s it was decided to deregulate the airport market and abolish the dominant position of PPL. Nearly all local airports (apart from Zielona Góra airport) became separate companies, with local governments involved in their management, which led to the partial decentralisation. Soon after opening of Polish sky for competition, flights "avoiding" the Warsaw hub became more common.

There are twelve passenger airports in operation, and there is also an airport Heringsdorf in German village Garz, 7 kilometers from Polish seaside spa Świnoujście.

=== International airports ===
List of airports in Poland The following are the largest airports in Poland (In descending order for 2013):

- Warsaw Chopin Airport
- Kraków John Paul II International Airport
- Gdańsk Lech Wałęsa International Airport
- Katowice Airport
- Wrocław Airport
- Poznań International Airport
- Rzeszów–Jasionka Airport
- Łódź Władysław Reymont Airport
- Solidarity Szczecin–Goleniów Airport
- Warsaw Modlin Airport
- Bydgoszcz Ignacy Jan Paderewski Airport
- Lublin Airport
- Warsaw Radom Airport
- Olsztyn-Mazury Airport

Domestic:

- Zielona Góra-Babimost Airport

Airports with paved runways: Total: 84 (2005)

- over 3,047 m: 4
- 2,438 to 3,047 m: 29
- 1,524 to 2,437 m: 41
- 914 to 1,523 m: 7
- under 914 m: 3

Airports – with unpaved runways: Total: 39 (2005)

- 2,438 to 3,047 m: 1
- 1,524 to 2,437 m: 4
- 914 to 1,523 m: 13
- under 914 m: 21

Heliports: 2 (2005)

== Water transport ==
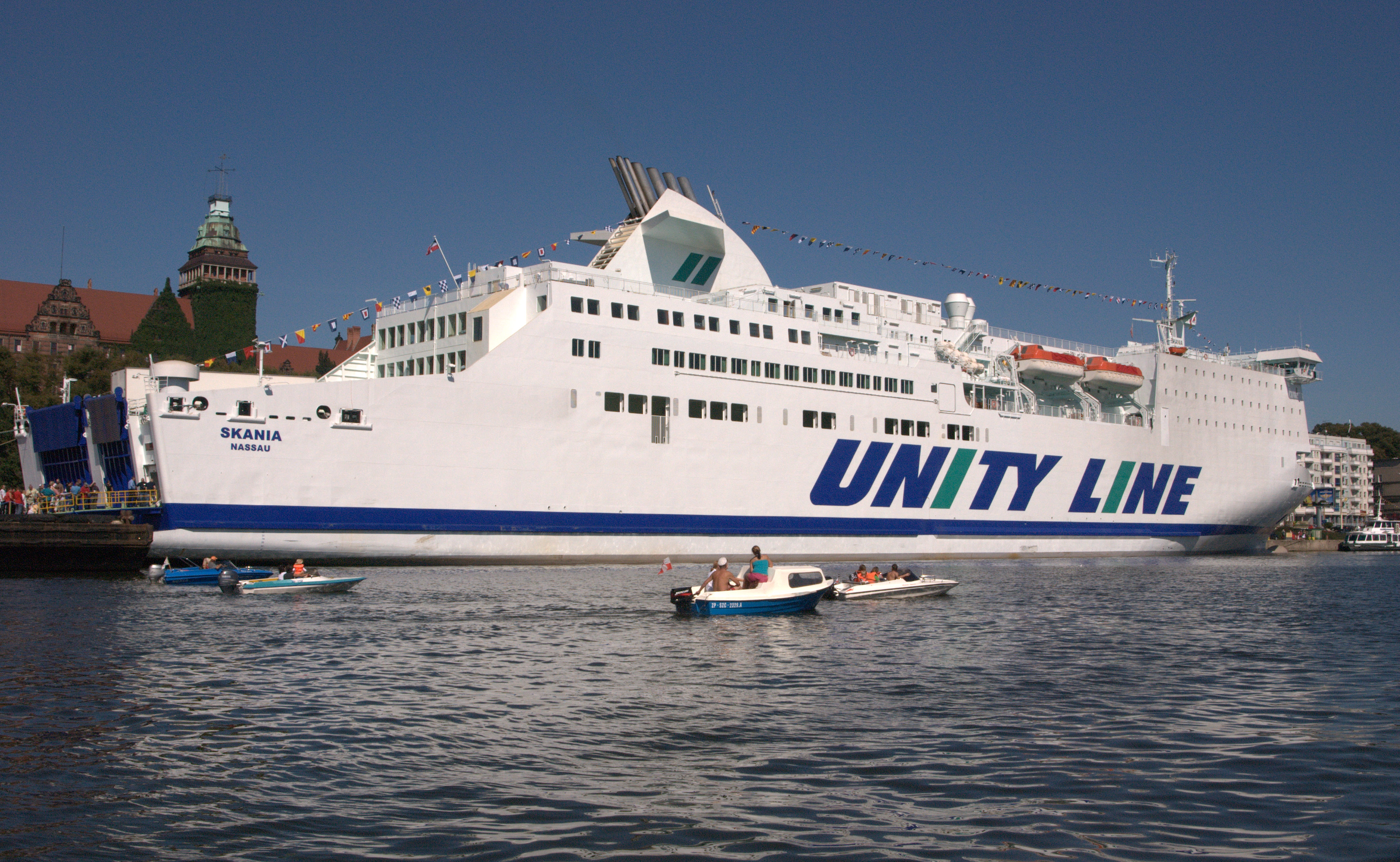
Ferries of Polish company Unity Line in the city of Szczecin

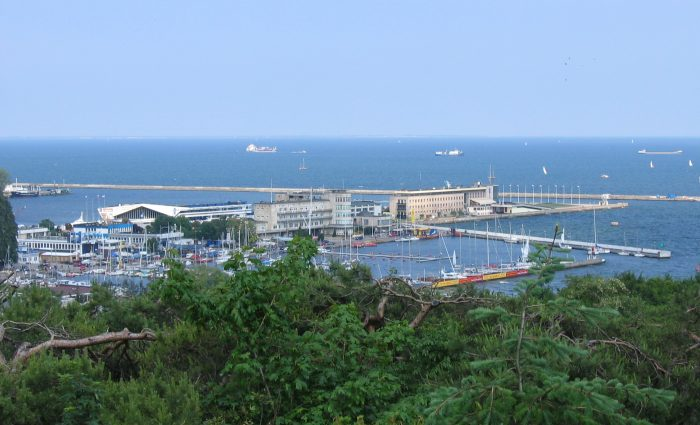
Gdynia's main municipal marina

The country's most important waterway is the river Vistula. The largest seaports are the Port of Szczecin and Port of Gdańsk.

Marine transport in Poland has two main sub-groups, riverine and seaborne. On the Baltic Sea coast, a number of large seaports exist to serve the international freight and passenger trade; these are typically deep water ports and are able to serve very large ships, including the ro-ro ferries of Unity Line, Polferries and Stena Line which operate the Poland – Scandinavia passenger lines.

Riverine services operate on almost all major Polish rivers and canals (such as the Danube–Oder and Elbląg canals) as well as on domestic coastal routes.

=== Waterways ===
Poland has 3,997 km (2,480 mi) of navigable rivers and canals (as of 2009).

=== Ports and harbors ===
- Port of Gdańsk (Polferries: Gdańsk — Nynäshamn / Ystad)
- Port of Gdynia (Stena Line: Gdynia — Karlskrona / Gothenburg and Finnlines: Gdynia — Helsinki / Rostock)
- Port of Szczecin-Świnoujście (Polferries: Świnoujście — Copenhagen / Ystad / Rønne and Unity Line: Świnoujście — Ystad / Trelleborg)
- Port of Police
- Port of Kołobrzeg
- Port of Ustka

=== Merchant marine ===
Total: 57 ships (1,000 GT or over) totaling 1,120,165 GT/1,799,569 tonnes deadweight (DWT)

Ships by type: bulk 50, cargo 2, chemical tanker 2, roll-on/roll-off 1, short-sea passenger 2 (1999 est.)

== Municipal transport ==
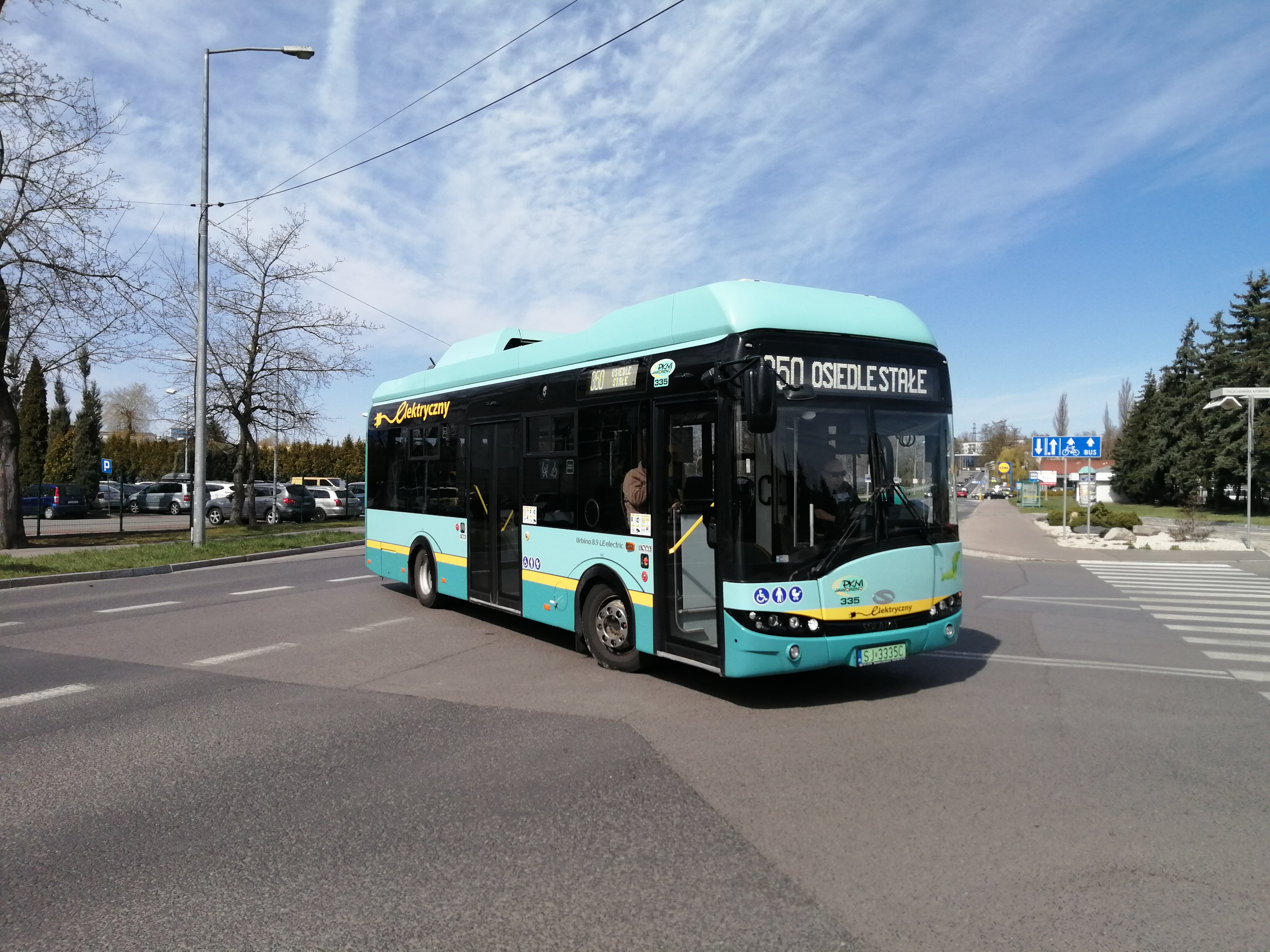
City bus in Jaworzno, manufactured by Polish company Solaris

=== Bus ===

Most Polish towns and cities have well-developed municipal bus services. Typically, a city possesses its own local bus service, however, in some cases they have private competitors operating on certain lines upon the agreement with local authorities.

Until the 1990s, interurban connections were operated by a single, state-owned company PKS. Since then, it has been broken into a number of independent national and municipal enterprises. In addition, several private operators emerged. There are two classes of service distinguished by vehicle length:

- autobus — longer vehicles (12.0 m and more),
- bus — shorter vehicles with smaller capacity, very popular on local connections, run by individual persons and smaller companies.

While they often use the same bus stops, they tend to use different stations.

=== Tram ===

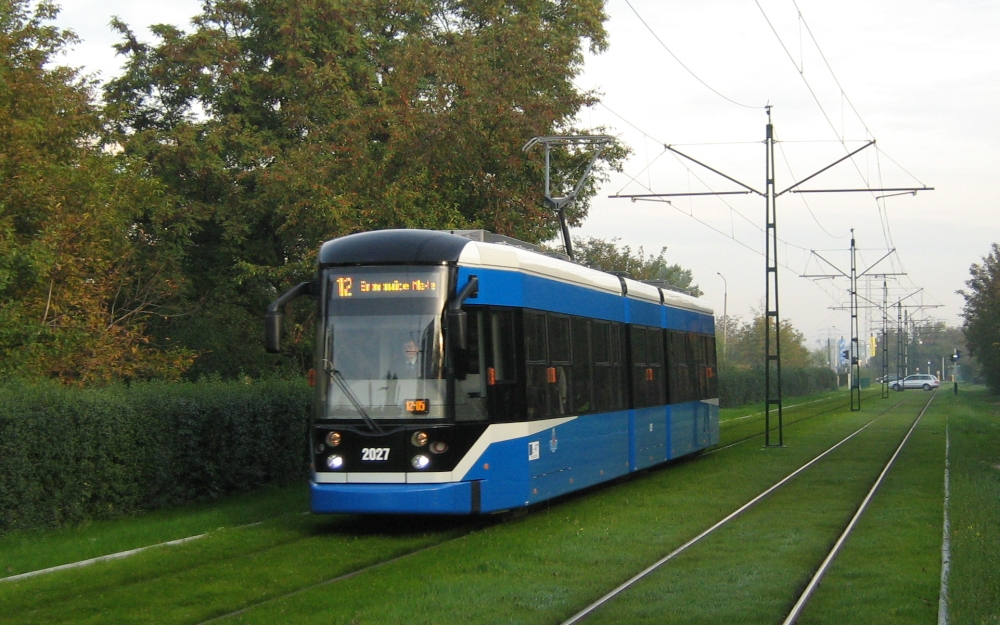
Bombardier tram in Kraków

Bigger cities run dense tram networks, which are the primary mean of public transport. Currently, there are 15 systems serving over 30 cities including Bydgoszcz, Gdańsk, Katowice, Kraków, Łódź, Poznań, Szczecin, Warsaw and Wrocław, with the total track length varying from 200 km (120 mi) (Silesian Interurbans) to less than 10 km (6 mi) (Trams in Grudziądz). A new network has been constructed in Olsztyn in 2015. See the list of town tramway systems in Poland

Since the 1990s, a number of cities attempts to upgrade certain parts of their networks to the light rail standard (called szybkie tramwaje, En. fast trams). The most notable investments are Poznań Fast Tram and Kraków Fast Tram with the underground 1.5 km (0.9 mi) premetro section.

=== Trolleybus ===
Trolleybuses can be found in three cities: Gdynia (with some lines reaching Sopot), Lublin and Tychy.

=== Rapid transit ===

The first metro line was opened in Warsaw in 1995. Part of the second line was opened in 2015. This is part of the country's rail transport infrastructure. There is an ongoing debate whether a new metro or premetro should be built in Kraków. The current President of Kraków, Aleksander Miszalski, supports the idea and has declared that first works will commence in 2028.

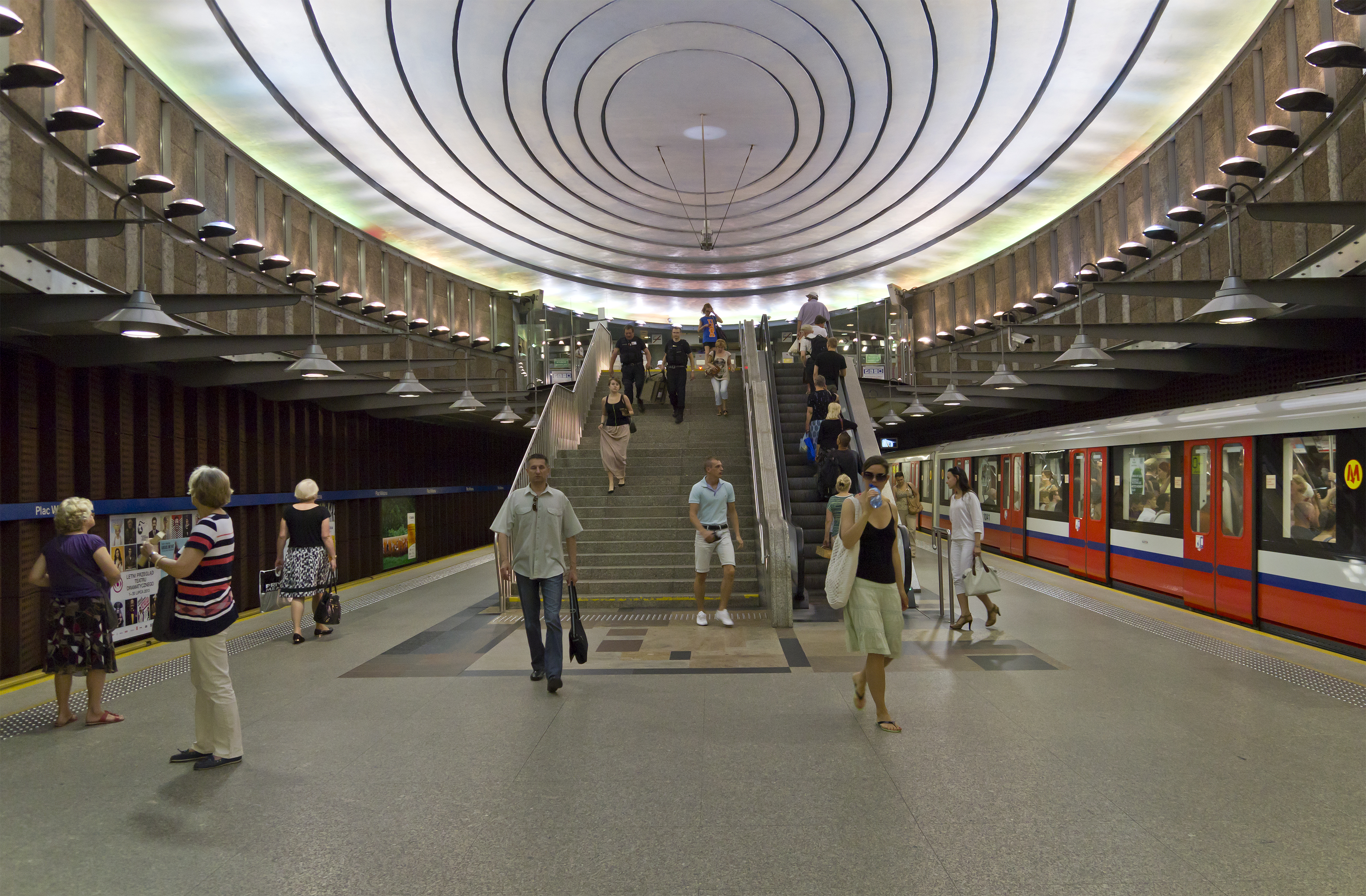
Plac Wilsona Station

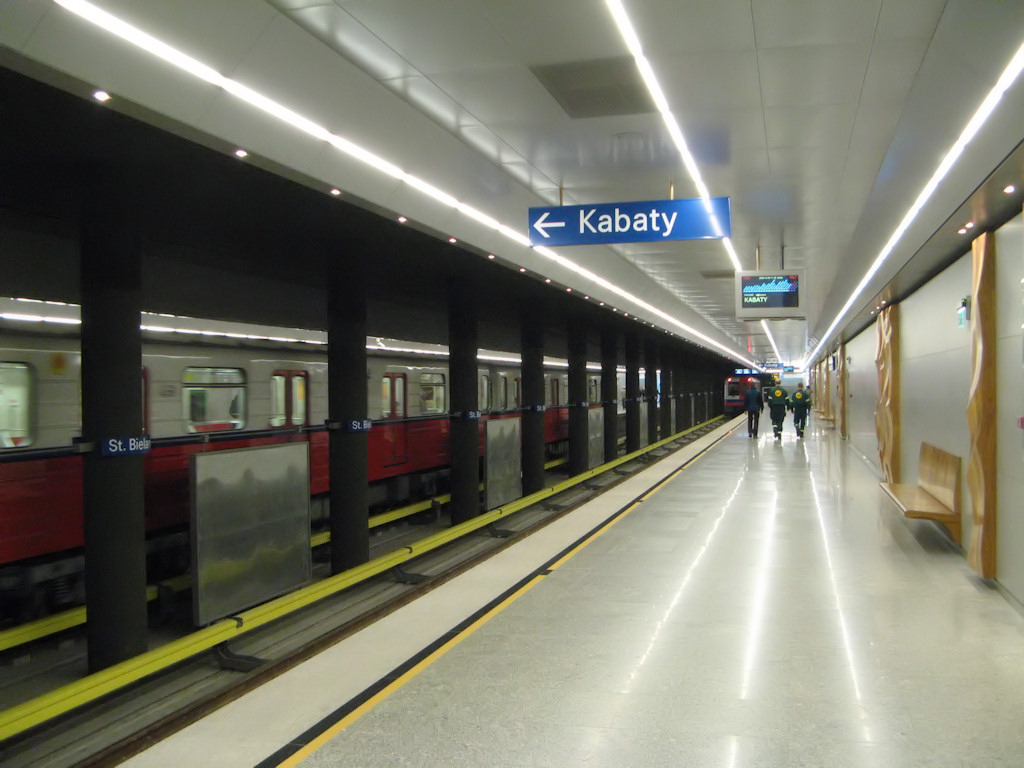
Stare Bielany station

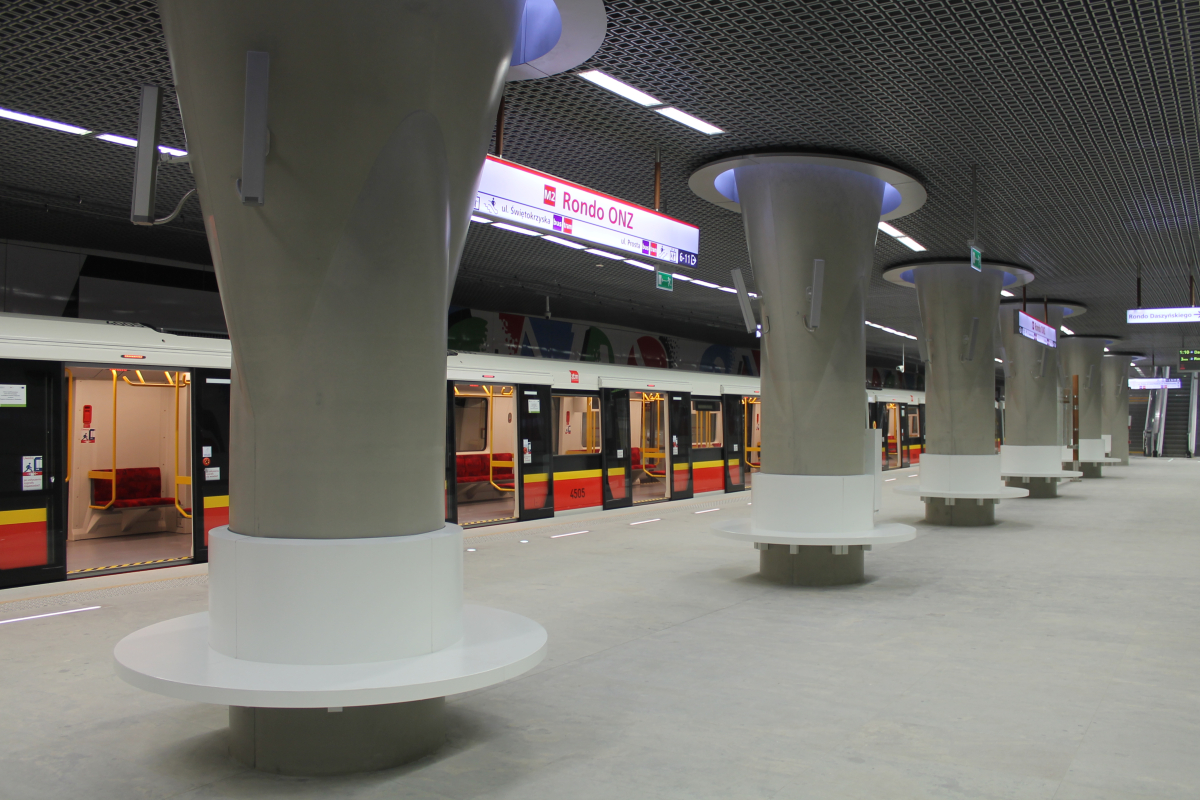
Rondo ONZ Station and the Siemens Inspiro stock train

=== Commuter trains ===

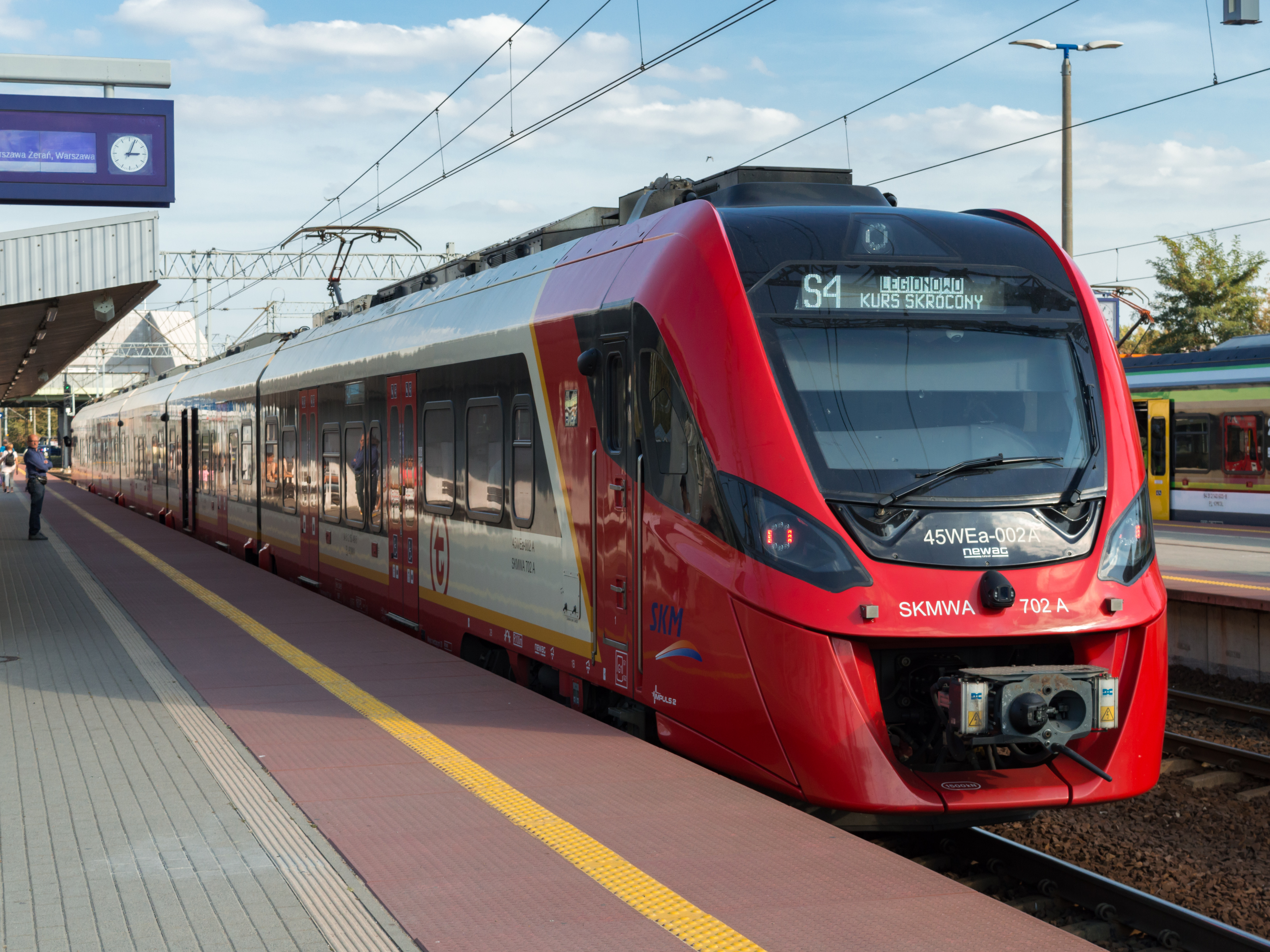
A Warsaw SKM train at Warszawa Gdańska

In major Polish cities such as Warsaw and the Tricity area, Commuter (SKM) trains provide efficient connections between the city center and surrounding suburbs or satellite towns. In other cities like Łódź (served by ŁKA) and Kraków (served by SKA), similar commuter rail services operate under different names but follow the same principles and rules.

== Pipelines ==
- Crude oil and petroleum products 2,280 km (1,420 mi)
- Natural gas 13,500 km (8,390 mi)

(2006 est.)

== See also ==
- Automotive industry in Poland
- List of bridges in Poland
- Plug-in electric vehicles in Poland
- Ports of the Baltic Sea
- Transportation and travel during the Polish–Lithuanian Commonwealth
