= Transportation and travel during the Polish–Lithuanian Commonwealth =

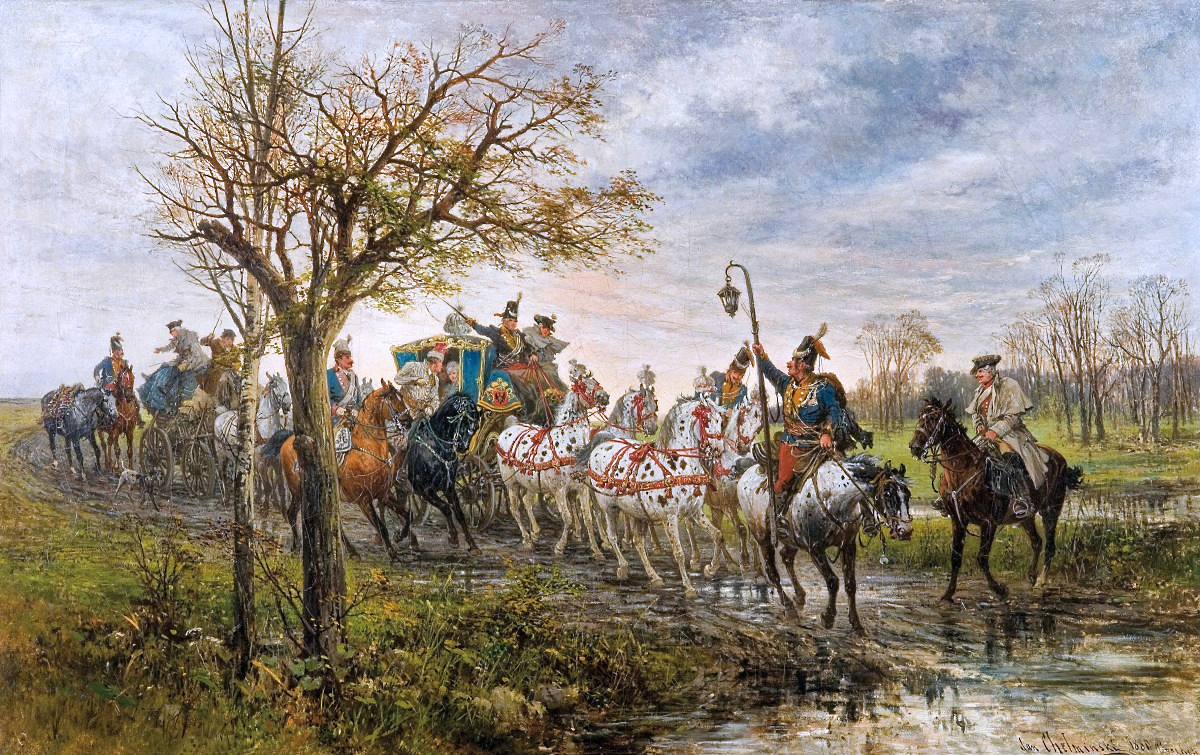
Magnate's retinue on a journey; painted by Jan Chełmiński (1880)

Travel in the Polish-Lithuanian Commonwealth, despite the poor condition of roads and bridges, was frequent. Foreigners, clergy, burghers, and peasants traveled, but most often it was representatives of the nobility who embarked on journeys. They traveled to visit relatives and acquaintances, attend court trials, as well as to attend local assemblies and events. Particularly grand were the processions of the magnates, often consisting of dozens of wagons and hundreds of horses. Due to the quality of land routes, river transport of goods and people played a significant role in mass transportation. Poles also traveled across Europe for educational, sightseeing, or diplomatic purposes. However, from the mid-17th century, xenophobia and ignorance among Polish travelers began to emerge, with them often considering visited countries inferior to the Commonwealth and their inhabitants as "commoners".

== Land routes and bridges ==
The state of roads in the Commonwealth was very poor, as both Poles and foreigners observed. Most of the tracks were unpaved and heavily worn. In autumn and during spring thaws, they turned into muddy peatland, in summer they were usually dusty, and in winter, drifts and blizzards in many places made transportation almost impossible. Another problem was the lack of bridges or their poor condition. It became proverbial: A Polish bridge, a German post, an Italian mass, all of this is folly, known in various versions throughout Europe as pons polonicus or eine polnische Brücke. Additional fees were required for crossing the most important bridges. In return, the owners of the crossings were obliged to maintain them in good condition. However, no one cared for most of the bridges, and rivers often had to be forded. Where the river was wider and deeper, ferry services operated or wide, flat-bottomed river vessels were used.

The Great Lithuanian Route connected the capital of Warsaw, with Vilnius, and a regular mail service was initiated during the reign of Augustus II.

=== Inns ===
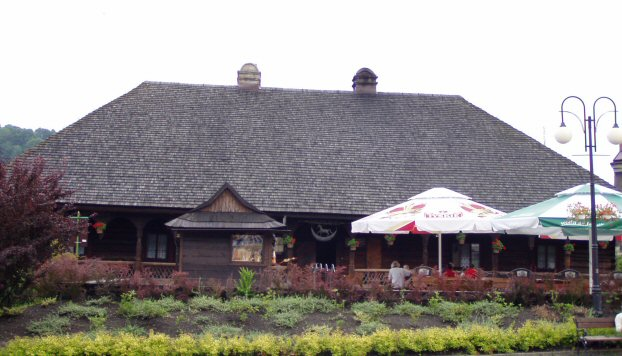
Inn Rome from the 18th century, present state

For overnight stays, people stopped at the homes of friends and relatives, in monasteries, or in numerous roadside inns. However, the quality of the latter left much to be desired. Typically, they were dirty, infested with vermin, and poorly equipped. The situation prevailing in them was described by Jan Jakub Kausch, a Silesian doctor traveling through Lesser Poland in the 18th century:

The traveler has no reason to dream of a hospitable room, of a bed, nor can he even count on satisfying his hunger. An inn in the city or in the countryside only differs from an ordinary house in that it consists of one large room with a fireplace and has a large stable for the travelers' horses. Those who bring along a significant supply of food and other necessary items can, of course, expect to meet their remaining minor needs; however, those who do not will keenly feel shortages at every step.

— Jan J. Kausch

Inns – as well as taverns in cities – had a bad reputation as favorite places for all sorts of "inn people": criminals, wanderers, and prostitutes. Only higher-class establishments had separate rooms for better guests. It was only at the end of the 17th century that hotels began to emerge. The first to deserve such a name was the Warsaw Marywil, built in the nineties of that century.

The inn was a fairly large wooden building, consisting of a spacious chamber with a vestibule and an alcove, as well as an adjoining shed, which served as a stable, carriage house, and lodging for travelers who, due to the noise and stuffiness or lack of space, could not sleep in the chamber.

Inns also had their own names, often mysterious. Such inns as Break, Shift, Favor, Wait, Outcry, or Robbers' Den were widely known. There were also those named after places, like Rome (a stopping place for pilgrims), Paris, or Warsaw. Some of these names were later adopted by settlements, suburbs, or districts of cities: Comfort, Loss, or New World.

== Water transportation ==
Due to the poor condition of the roads, timber rafting played an important role in mass transportation. Rivers such as the Vistula, San, Bug, Narew, Neman, Warta, Pina, Dnieper, and Dvina, as well as the Royal Canal, were the main communication arteries of the Commonwealth. Gdańsk was the main destination port, while Elbląg, Liepāja, Riga, and Reval played smaller roles. The navigation season lasted from March to November. Lumber and forest products were mainly transported, along with grain, organized by magnates, nobility, clergy, burghers, and even wealthy Pomeranian peasants. Out of 246 legal proceedings regarding abuses in grain sales in Gdańsk in the 16th and 17th centuries, servants transporting grain accounted for 209 cases (~85%), while only 37 cases (15%) involved noble owners as carriers.

The middle and lower nobility usually organized river transport with the help of apprentices and serfs, avoiding the expense of hiring expensive, organized guild professional raftsmen (who charged a fee of 6% or more of the value of the goods transported), and contenting themselves with employing only one skilled journeyman, who was responsible for guiding several boats with peasant raftsmen to their destination. The nobility had an advantage over the burghers, who had to rely on professional raftsmen and were also not exempt from customs duties.

Goods were transported by various river vessels, from large oar-sail punts and "dubas" to simple raft ships, barges and rafts. Their operation required a team of specialists. The most important among them was the shipping manager (szyper), who supervised the retmen, helmsmen, and the basic crew of raftsmen (oryle).

Punts were also used for passenger transport. Entire noble estates sometimes traveled in this way. When King Sigismund III Vasa set out for Sweden in 1594, he traveled from Warsaw to Gdańsk by the Vistula to board a seafaring vessel there, at the Wisłoujście Fortress. It is also worth mentioning the use of water transport for other purposes: for example, in the 16th century, the tomb of the last Masovian dukes, Stanisław and Janusz, was transported from Kraków to Warsaw along the Vistula.

Maritime navigation was much less popular. Apart from the coastal fishermen and sailors, few ventured out to sea. Even the main port city, Gdańsk, did not have a significant fleet and mostly relied on the services of foreign shipowners: in the second half of the 15th and early 16th centuries, the cost of shipping goods by sea usually exceeded half of their value. The ships themselves were also costly; the average age of their service did not exceed 2–4 years, and numerous port and customs fees, taxes, and sailor wages required significant investments, which only the wealthiest of Gdańsk merchants could afford.

Poles were reluctant to venture out to sea, feeling more confident and secure on land:

Safer with a spear, the Pole will leap in the field,
And on land, to the saber, he'll more readily yield –
Let mast, sail, and anchor have their crooked way,
For those who dwell above Neptune's salty spray!

— Kasper Miaskowski, Zbiór rytmów

A nobleman, or even a Gdańsk patrician, preferred to learn from books about distant sea voyages, rather than from firsthand experience. Johannes Dantiscus, a native of Gdańsk, after a journey from England to the Iberian Peninsula in 1522, declared that he would not undertake it again "even for the price of the kingdom of the world".

== Forms of land transport ==
=== Approximate travel speed (km/h) and distance traveled per day ===
Means of transport	Speed in kilometers per hour	Daily distance
On foot	3–4	20–25 kilometres (12–16 mi)
By carriage	4–6	25–30 kilometres (16–19 mi)
On horseback	7–9	30–40 kilometres (19–25 mi)
By stagecoach	15–18	60–70 kilometres (37–43 mi)
In a cavalcade of magnates		25–30 kilometres (16–19 mi)

The poorest travelers moved on foot, while others rode on horseback or used various wheeled vehicles, sometimes pulled by oxen. For less affluent people, the so-called kolasa was a common means of transportation, which was a simple cart with seating places. Wealthy individuals, on the other hand, used different modes of transport. It was customary for a nobleman to travel on horseback, unless age or health prevented them from doing so. In the 16th century, among the upper classes, a cradle suspended from leather straps became popular (kolebka). Covered wagons called coaches or kotcze also enjoyed considerable popularity. From the 17th century, the magnates used luxurious, richly decorated carriages. In the 18th century, light vehicles designed for short trips and walks came into use: vis-à-vis, phaetons, carioles, and solo carriages. In the second half of the 18th century, stagecoaches appeared on the main roads, significantly reducing travel time between cities. The speed of travel varied, as shown in the table above.

=== Polish horses ===
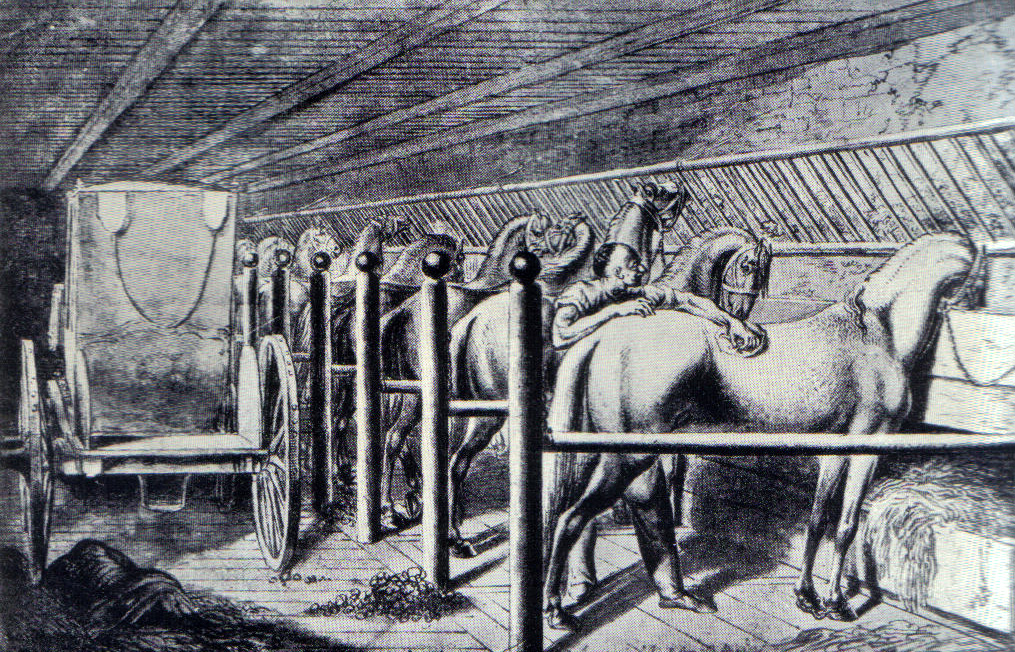
Polish stable in Gdańsk, Daniel Chodowiecki (1773)

In the times of the Polish-Lithuanian Commonwealth, the horse played a very important role in almost every aspect of citizens' lives, especially among the nobility. It was needed as a means of transportation, served in war, and was also a companion for leisure activities and hunting. Horse breeding, highly valued abroad as well, was conducted on a large scale. These horses, whose breed disappeared at the turn of the 18th and 19th centuries, were characterized by: height (150–160 cm), "Arabian" head, high withers, rounded croup, and dry limbs with distinct tendons. The Polish horse was slower than the Arabian, but more robust, resilient to hardships, poorer food, and weather changes. Foreigners appreciated it for its endurance, soft gait, strength, and the fact that it did not need shoeing, as its hooves were very hard.

The large estate stables often numbered even several thousand mounts and enjoyed considerable esteem both in Poland and abroad. Breeding was conducted, among others, by the Sanguszko family in Slavuta, the Buczacki family in Buchach, the Sobieski family in Zhovkva, and the Chodkiewicz family in the Lyakhavichy estates in Black Ruthenia. Even moderately affluent nobles often owned several dozen horses. War horses came precisely from noble stables, so the breeding had to be of a high standard. A member of the Grocholski family wrote about these animals:

Speak of the English breed if you must,
Of the cold-blooded Percherons in trust!
Argue and debate in clamor and fuss
About foreign horses tails, you thrust.
But who truly knows and understands
The steadfast and noble breeds in lands,
Knows well the origin, so grand,
Of the famous Polish horse brand.

— Adam R. Grocholski, Dla Franciszka – Podole 1934

Horses were used for transportation, but primarily for military purposes. In the Commonwealth, almost no infantry exercises were practiced, as summarized by Łukasz Górnicki's words: We don't play with saws like they do in France. Polish horses, due to their strength and endurance, were primarily used as cavalry mounts. Other breeds served as draught animals, ranging from peasant-bred konik and Hucul ponies to cold-blooded horses, imported by wealthy nobility and magnates from abroad, which became a common practice only in the 19th century.

=== Noble travel caravan ===
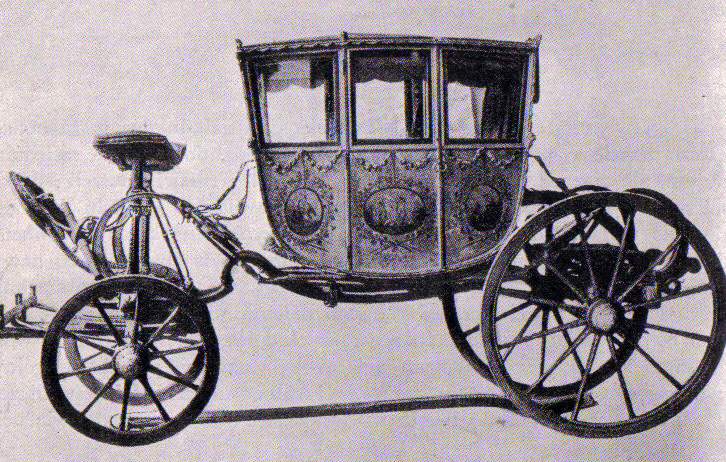
The carriage of the archbishop of Lviv from the 18th century

The size, grandeur, and number of attendants in a caravan reflected the wealth and status of the traveler. A representative of the middle nobility usually traveled at the head of a caravan consisting of four to six wagons. The first carriage was designated for the lord (unless he traveled on horseback). Following were the lady's carriage and the kitchen wagon. The procession was concluded by the "treasure wagons", containing wardrobe, bedding, and travel service. Several loose horses and a group of servants accompanied the caravan. The servants tended to the needs of the estate and also played a defensive role, providing the necessary strength, for example, to pull wagons out of mud or push them through fords.

=== Magnates' procession ===
Magnates traveled much more splendidly, aiming to display their social status. Their caravans often consisted of several dozen wagons: treasure wagons, kitchen wagons, wine cellars, carriages for ladies, cradles for courtiers, and so on. Each wagon was drawn by six or even eight horses, although three or four would have sufficed. Hundreds of servants also accompanied the procession. Most of them did not serve any function but their mere presence indicated the wealth of the master. To display extravagance, white horses had their manes painted red, and the vehicles were richly gilded. They were upholstered with costly fabrics, and adorned with carpets and sculptures. Mikołaj Rej already described those various and strangely aromatic cradles with hanging carpets, with high headboards, with scarlet pompons, and gilded ornaments.

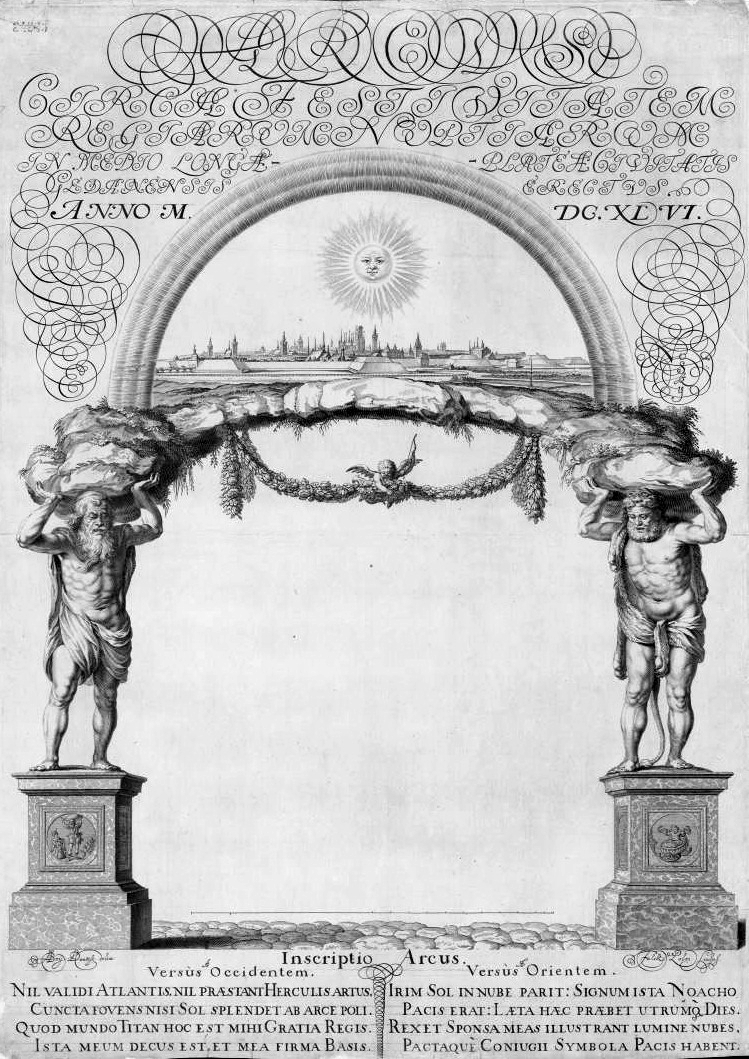
Triumphal arch with Atlas and Hercules erected in Gdańsk in honor of Marie Louise Gonzaga (1646)

Many pieces of information about the wealth and size of magnates' processions are found in preserved sources. The Kyiv Voivode Konstanty Wasyl Ostrogski would take a carriage of valuables on every journey, even the shortest: three dozen golden dishes, several dozen gilded or entirely golden plates, several dozen white-silver plates, six gigantic bowls, several dozen spoons, a large silver bath with golden rims, not counting flasks and cups, etc. Other magnates did similarly, taking numerous armors, garments, and jewels with them. The splendor of noble journeys is evidenced by the words of Duke Bogusław Radziwiłł from 1665 addressed to his fiancée: even if I came incognito to Mitau, I would still have to bring along 1000 horses and men, to devour Mitau altogether. The magnate didn't exaggerate, as for example, the journey of Prince Adam Czartoryski from Puławy to Volhynia was carried out with 400 horses and 14 camels. Similarly, in 1778, Prince Karol Radziwiłł entered Lviv preceded by a caravan of camels and pack mules. Such entries, both of magnates and kings, were grand celebrations, sometimes even elevated to the level of public holidays. Houses and streets were adorned, and the passage of the procession was brightly lit at night. Special temporary structures were often erected, primarily triumphal arches.

The detailed description of the lavish travels of Stanisław Lubomirski can be found in the brochure written by his steward, Stanisław Czarniecki. The departure of the procession was spread over five days. On the first day, the contingent of court Hungarian infantry would set off, on the second, the procession of carriage and riding horses, on the third, the musicians, on the fourth, the hunting party, and only on the fifth day would Lubomirski himself depart with his courtiers. Accompanying the carriage were a retinue dressed in silver armor of Cossacks and a dragoon team. Further on, a long line of wagons carrying the magnate's entourage would move forward.

The journeys of magnates were associated with great expenses. For example, the expedition of Szczęsny Potocki from Tulczyn to Liuboml in 1792 cost a very high amount for those times, 372,000 Polish zlotys. The splendor of the processions was summed up in satirical words by Sebastian Klonowic:

The spirit is feeble, it went to the simpleton,
Who doesn't hide a procession of a thousand people,
And he will lose much of his nobility,
Who doesn't have a procession of horses pulling his carriage.
Now even a six-horse, a four-horse, and a three-horse carriage,
Belong only to those who live by begging.
And indeed, even though we lose, we willingly perish
We refuse to ride with just a dozen horses.

— Sebastian Fabian Klonowic, Worek Judaszowy

== Domestic travel ==
The state of communication arteries being limited and the self-sufficient nature of noble manor houses might suggest that the inhabitants of the Polish-Lithuanian Commonwealth rarely left their homes and only when absolutely necessary. In reality, the situation was quite the opposite: Poles traveled very often and for many different reasons. This situation is aptly summarized by a German parable, according to which a Pole's life revolved around three things: declamation, revelry, and travels (Latin: declamationes, comessationes et profectiones quotidiance). Similar opinions were expressed by both Poles and foreigners: the Frenchman Laboureur called the inhabitants of the Commonwealth the greatest travelers of Europe (French: les plus grands voyageurs de l’Europe). Polish sources also depict numerous examples of a nobleman as a "carrier," traveling with a "craftsman's whip".

=== Burghers and peasants ===
Peasants did not travel very often, and when they did, it was primarily for business purposes. They would set out on foot or by cart to attend markets and fairs. Their mobility was limited by their attachment to the land and the closed structure of a noble folwark. However, it did happen that a landowner would send a young peasant to the army or to the city to learn a trade, or that a protege of the parish priest would end up "going to school" and – if he returned – bring news from the world to the village.

One form of movement was the flight of serf peasants, who – although not very massively – moved to less populated areas, thereby creating a layer of free population. These escapes fueled the population of areas depopulated by Tatar raids in Ukraine and the borderlands of Prussia and Mazovia: Kurpie, Masuria.

For the burghers, traveling was hindered by the prohibition of owning rural estates and the high cost of transportation. Representatives of this class (excluding the patriciate of royal cities: Kraków, Lviv, and primarily Gdańsk) did not travel for political purposes due to very limited civil rights, as matters of power, justice, and military affairs were the domain of the nobility. However, there were cities (especially from the mid-15th to the mid-17th century) that were vibrant trading centers. Lublin stood out in this regard, becoming a meeting place for merchants from both parts of the Commonwealth. However, after the Second Northern War, a slow decline of cities was noticed, affecting even the largest among them (e.g., Poznań had only 30% of its population compared to the 1640s). The decline of cities in the 18th century was even deeper; this is best illustrated by the third stanza of Monachomachia:

In a city whose name I won't mention,
It matters not, as it adds nothing to the story;
In a city, which I call a collection of voids,
A suitable dwelling for both peasant and Jew;
In a city (for the castle and land held sway there,
An ancient stronghold, the horror of emptiness).
There were three taverns, four broken gates,
Nine monasteries, and here and there, some cottages.

— Bishop Ignacy Krasicki, Monachomachia / Song I

=== Nobility ===
The nobility traveled for numerous and varied reasons. Often, they visited friends and family. An Italian observer noted that Poles were constantly on the move to visit relatives and friends, and not even a hundred-mile distance would deter them. Besides visiting estates, they also traveled for commercial purposes and to conduct legal affairs. Lawsuits were common among the nobility. As Władysław Łoziński stated, There was hardly a nobleman who did not go to law, did not need to have some privilege certified, a deed or prenuptial agreement ratified; to act for something to be remembered for eternity, to open up, to manifest or protest. The nobility, as the ruling class, also gathered at local assemblies (sejmiki), where, among other things, they elected MPs to the national Sejm and representatives to the Crown Tribunal. Less frequently, they attended military reviews, obligatory but commonly ignored events. They also traveled to schools, primarily Jesuit and Piarist colleges, as well as Protestant gymnasiums.

The usual destinations of these travels were provincial capitals, connected by main communication routes. Capital cities such as Kraków, Warsaw, and Vilnius, as well as the seats of the Crown Tribunal in Lublin and Piotrków, held particular importance. Trade was concentrated in Lviv, Gdańsk, and Toruń, so nobles often traveled there for business purposes.

=== Visitors from abroad ===
Prominent Western travelers who left descriptions of what they saw in Poland included foreigners such as diplomats, artists, clergymen, military personnel, and merchants. Their observations were sometimes detailed in extensive accounts, such as the Description de l’Ukraine by Marquis Guillaume Le Vasseur de Beauplan, a French architect, cartographer, and writer who spent eighteen years in the Commonwealth (1630–1648).

In addition to these visitors, for whom Poland was just one stage of their journey, there were also those who settled permanently. Among them were numerous Germans in the cities (who assimilated quite rapidly), Vlachs, Scots, Tatars, and Armenians, who easily assimilated and established their trade, cultural, and religious centers in cities like Lviv, Zamość, and Kazimierz near the Vistula river. They monopolized Eastern trade and were perceived as:

Here are the hairy Armenian merchants,
Bringing goods rich from the East;
From them, one can get Turkish carpets,
From them, golden threads and silk for clothes;
Fragrant cinnamon, which we desire so much,
Counts among their imported goods;
Pepper, sugar cane, ginger, and sweet dates,
Nutmeg flower and virgin saffron.

— Sebastian Klonowic, Roxolania 1584

=== Correspondence ===
The exchange of letters played an important role in the lives of both the nobility and the burghers. The art of letter writing was primarily practiced by representatives of the upper classes, who in their correspondence addressed not only private matters but also state affairs. Private messengers called kozaks were responsible for delivering letters. For shorter distances, serf peasants also acted as messengers. The costs of maintaining messengers and the necessity of paying for their travel meant that correspondence was relatively slow, and often, there was a delay in sending letters. Voivode of Poznań, Krzysztof Opaliński, wrote to his brother Łukasz: Dated on a holy day in 1642, hence the delay, as I did not want to send a "kozak" to Rytwiany for free. The situation improved with the establishment of a regular postal service by King Sigismund II Augustus in 1558. Initially, it connected Kraków with Venice (the king entrusted its establishment to a Kraków merchant named Prosper Prowanie, the brother of a nobleman from Piedmont, Troian, who served as Queen Bona's secretary). However, over time, it expanded to cover most of the country's major cities. Its operations ceased completely due to the numerous wars of the 17th century, which again forced magnates to rely on private messengers.

== Travel abroad ==
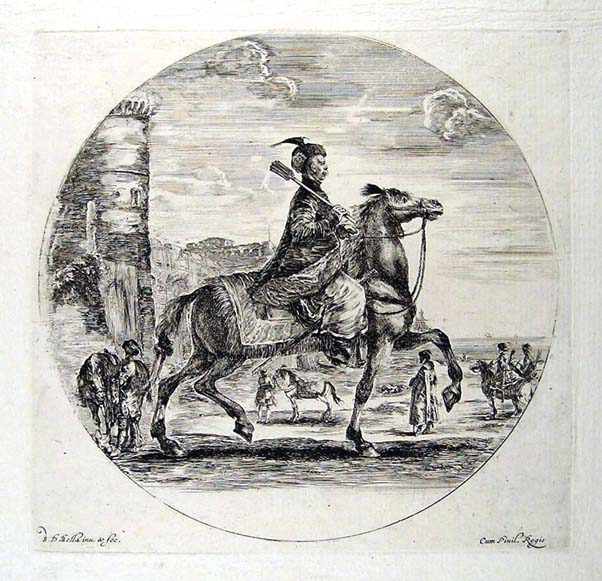
Polish horseman, Stefano della Bella

The opinion about Polish travelers was not solely based on their tendency to move around the country. Residents of the Commonwealth also traveled abroad, albeit less frequently. Particularly in the 16th century, trips to Italy were popular. Those who went there were primarily clergy, magnates, and wealthy nobility. Their motivations were not so much cultural or artistic interests, but rather the desire to acquire practical knowledge in legal, economic, political, diplomatic, and commercial matters. The prevalence of travel did not diminish over time, despite the spread of xenophobic views characteristic of the Sarmatian era. In the 17th and 18th centuries, numerous Polish magnates traveled across Europe, and their processions often elicited surprise and admiration.

=== Educational travels ===
Many Polish Renaissance-era artists praised the idea of sending young nobility to study in Western Europe. People like Nicolaus Copernicus, who studied in Bologna and Padua, and Jan Kochanowski, a graduate of the University of Padua, obtained such education. Even Mikołaj Rej, often considered a homebody, echoing the words of Łoziński, completely covered in Polish moss, wrote that it is a fine thing for a young man to travel to foreign countries. Italian universities (Padua, Bologna, Rome) were particularly popular, later followed by German and French ones.

Already, Rej cautioned that a young man should not return home in perfumed gloves and flashy jackets, but the broader criticism of foreign travels grew in the 17th century. With the spread of Sarmatian ideas, including notions of the superiority and uniqueness of the Polish nobility, numerous dangers associated with sending youth abroad for studies began to be recognized. Jakub Sobieski wrote of the Poles: It is a harsh thing when they arrive in foreign lands as calves and depart as oxen. Similarly, Andrzej Maksymilian Fredro lamented: We bring back more sins from foreign countries than learning, more frivolity than manners. Moralists of the 18th century and foreign observers expressed similar sentiments. One of them argued that if patriotic spirit has waned in Poland, the main cause of it was travel. In this light, it's not surprising to find a letter from Hetman Stanisław Żółkiewski advising his wife against sending their son abroad, as he will hardly return with anything good from there.

As a result of criticism from the 17th century onwards, educational travels, known as the "grand tour", were undertaken almost exclusively by the sons of magnates. In most cases, enrolling in lectures was merely an excuse, as few travelers actually pursued studies. Ignacy Krasicki portrayed such a journey, aimed more at amusement than learning, in the first Polish novel: The Adventures of Mr. Nicholas Wisdom.

=== Sightseeing trips and Poles' attitudes towards the places visited ===
In the 16th century, among the wealthy nobility, there was considerable popularity for sightseeing expeditions to Western Europe, particularly Italy. These journeys had their roots in humanistic currents and Renaissance-era views. Jan Kochanowski was among those who traveled, as he described in his poem To the Mountains and Forests:

Nothing hinders, while the lazy days don't wane,
To see the broad Danube, to see the crooked Alps,
Or where amidst the sea, a famous city lies,
Or where beneath ancient walls, the swift Tiber flows...

— Jan Kochanowski, Fraszki, II 26, 8-11

The voivode of Sieradz, Stanisław Łaski, also embarked on a long journey through foreign lands. In the mid-16th century, he supposedly visited Italy, Germany, France, Spain, Hungary, and Turkey, as well as countries in Asia and Africa. Shorter journeys were undertaken by figures such as Jan Szczęsny Herburt and Jan Tęczyński. The popularity of such expeditions did not diminish in the first half of the 17th century.

From the Sarmatian era, the written accounts of magnates who left the Commonwealth on diplomatic missions have been preserved, as well as their diaries recalling the large numbers of fellow countrymen encountered on the roads. Most of them returned from foreign countries convinced of the superiority of the Poles over other nations. Jerzy Ossoliński almost disdainfully spoke of the Dutch: rusticitas of the proud peasantry, that is, the gentlemen holding office there. Similarly, young Andrzej Stanisław Załuski, later Chancellor and bishop, described with pity in his memoirs the Spanish and Portuguese dignitaries, whom he regarded as people of coarse intellect and simpletons. Similarly, in 1624, royal secretary Stefan Pac, accompanying Prince Władysław Vasa, expressed his indignation about the Swedes' familiarity which these peasants have usurped. An exception in this regard were travelers like Jan Zawadzki. In 1633, he set out on a diplomatic mission to England. Along the way, he had the opportunity to visit the port in Amsterdam, about which he wrote: I wish we could see all this in our country too!

Many magnates, while traveling, also engaged in sightseeing in foreign countries. Their accounts often reveal a noticeable lack of education and ignorance. An example can be found in the notes of Krzysztof Zawisza, the voivode of Minsk, who embarked on a journey to Italy in 1700. He esteemed books made of wood, which are hard to distinguish from real books, more highly than the paintings of Tintoretto and Titian, and he dubbed Asinelli tower in Bologna as the donkey tower. He also praised the Last Judgment in the Sistine Chapel as painted by the famous painter Archangel Gabriel.

=== Magnates' travel and related costs ===
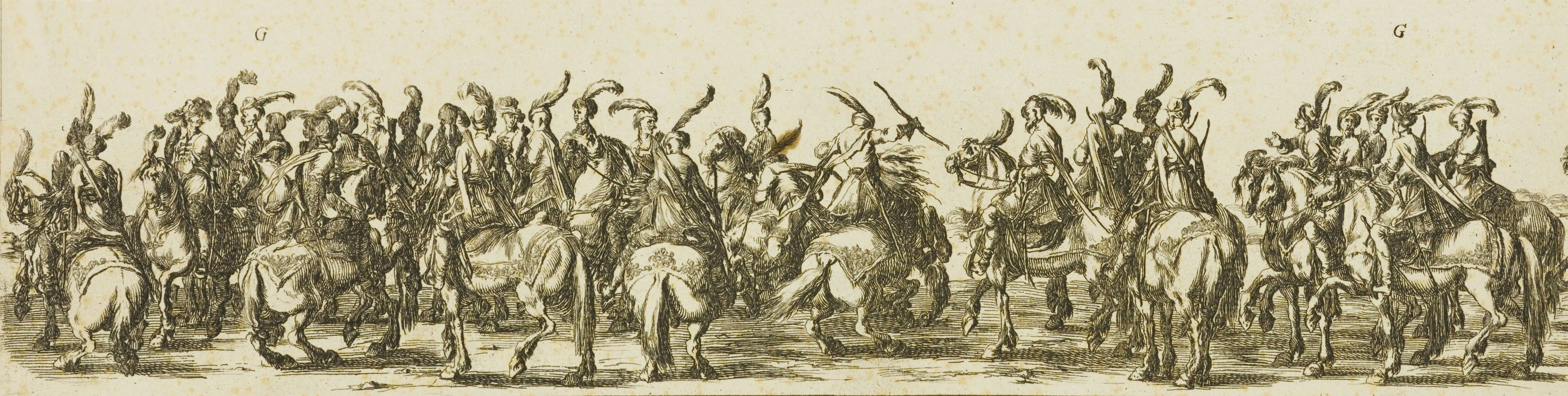
Entry of George Ossoliński's envoy to Rome in 1633 (fragment); drawn by Stefano della Bella

Just as in the country, so abroad, the processions of Polish magnates were very rich and numerous. The most magnificent were the entries of Polish embassies into the capitals of foreign powers; the ambassador represented not only his own splendor but above all the power and wealth of the Commonwealth. Jerzy Ossoliński, who served as an ambassador to the Holy See, in 1633 entered Rome with a hundred horses and camels adorned with gold, silver, and semi-precious stones. On them rode the gentry in national costumes and captives from eastern countries (Tatars, Turks). The horses were shoed in such a way that they lost golden horseshoes on the cobblestones during the procession, and young nobles threw ducats into the crowd.

Such ceremonies were very spectacular, so the words of the English 18th-century historian Catharine Macaulay, who attributed to the Poles an abundance of "ostentatious qualities", are not surprising. Magnate trips were also exceptionally expensive. For example, the diplomatic journey of Michał Radziwiłł to Austria and Italy in 1674 cost 744,000 Polish zlotys and consumed the papal subsidies granted to the Commonwealth for the war with Turkey.

A convincing proof of the costliness of foreign travels was left by hetman Krzysztof Radziwiłł in the Ultimatum addressed to the guardian of his son, Janusz:

I did not send him to foreign lands for such purposes, not at such expense, so that Janusz could learn how to make gingerbread in Nuremberg; sit there as you please, be bored as you wish, for surely I shall neither know nor think of you (...) and not a penny shall I send, even if you were to perish in the tower.

— Krzysztof Radziwiłł, List do...

This sharp-worded letter was a response to the expenses of the journey, which already for these two years, since they left Poland, have taken over 100,000 Polish zlotys.

=== Military travel ===
A peculiar form of foreign travel was military campaigns in foreign countries. Abroad (i.e., in the West), the Lisowczyks were primarily the ones who fought, but in exceptional cases, beyond the territories directly bordering the Commonwealth, ventured mercenary troops (wojsko kwarciane) and even the levy of the general population (pospolite ruszenie). An example is Stefan Czarniecki's campaign in Denmark in 1659, the final stage of the Second Northern War. Its course, as well as the customs and life of the inhabitants of Denmark, were vividly described in a colorful manner in the memoirs of one of the participants in the battles:

The people there are good-looking; fair-headed and overly fair-skinned, they dress beautifully, but walk in wooden clogs, both the country folk and the townsmen. When they walk on the cobblestone streets in the city, they make such a clatter that you can't hear someone speaking to you. As for the upper-class ladies, they wear clogs just like Polish women... Their beds for sleeping are tucked into the walls like closets, and the bedding there is laid with excessive force. They sleep naked, just as they were born, and do not consider it shameful, undressing and dressing in front of each other, and they don't even bother about guests, but remove all ornaments by candlelight; and in the end, they remove even their shirts and hang everything on hooks, and only then, naked, after closing the doors and extinguishing the candle, do they crawl into bed in that closet... When they slaughter an ox, pig, or sheep, they won't let a single drop of blood go to waste, but collect it in a vessel; mixing it with barley or millet groats, they stuff the intestines of the animal with it, then cook and serve it as a delicacy in a large bowl at every meal...

— Jan Chryzostom Pasek, Pamiętniki

=== Attitude towards compatriots abroad ===
In the 17th century, many Poles traveled across Europe, as evidenced by the diary kept by the sons of the Voivode of Bełz, Jakub Sobieski, during their European tour. They personally encountered around thirty compatriots, including not only magnates but also representatives of the middle nobility. This number turns out to be exceptionally large when considering the caution that travelers attempted to adhere to. The voivode instructed them in writing: When it comes to conversing with our fellow Poles, I implore you for the love of God, I order and beseech you under the blessing, to proceed with the utmost caution, and I will pray to the Lord God that as few Poles as possible will be where you are. These paternal words were meant to illustrate the widespread belief in the quarrelsome, gossiping, envious, wasteful, and bad habits of the majority of Polish citizens residing abroad, from whom rare good entertainment is to be had there. Other similar warnings are found in sources, although there is no evidence that the prevailing majority of Polish travelers actually possessed the aforementioned pejorative traits. It is also difficult to accept that Poles stood out in terms of flaws compared to arrivals from other countries.

=== Poles outside Europe ===
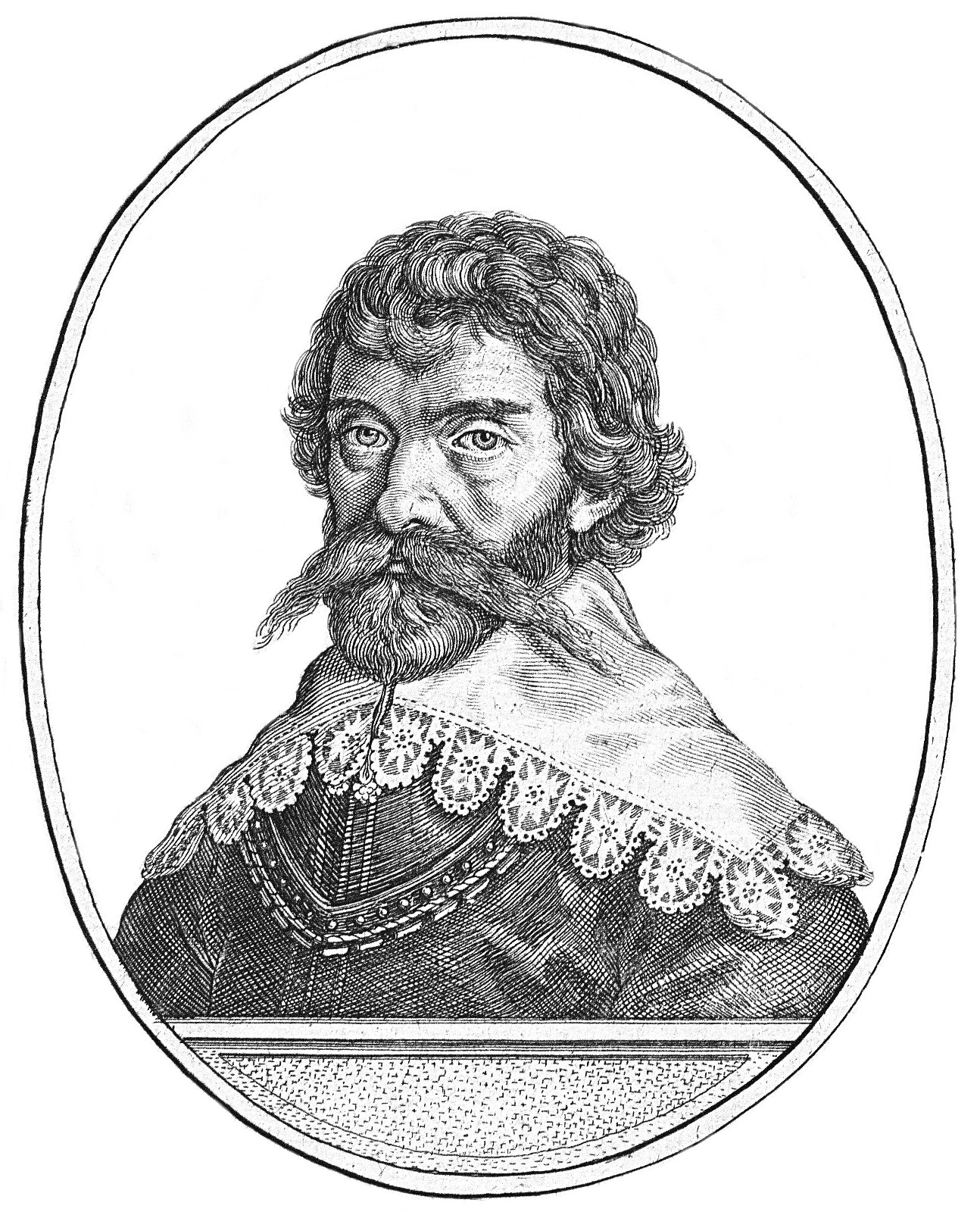
Krzysztof Arciszewski in Dutch service

The Polish-Lithuanian Commonwealth was not interested in the colonial expansion (the only exception being the vassal of Poland, the Duke of Courland and Semigallia, Jakub Kettler, who in the mid-17th century unsuccessfully attempted to establish colonies in Gambia and the Caribbean), but historical sources contain certain information about Polish travelers visiting India, America, and other previously unknown lands. These travelers included both independent adventurers and individuals participating in official missions of colonial powers such as Portugal, Spain, and the Netherlands.

Several different documents depict the travels of Poles to India, primarily to the Portuguese colony of Goa. One such document is a letter from Krzysztof Pawłowski, who embarked from Lisbon to Goa in April 1596. In letters to his friends, he described in detail the course of the six-month voyage: passing the Cape of Good Hope, the fortress of Mozambique, and circumnavigating the Island of St. Lawrence (Madagascar). He also mentioned numerous dangers encountered during the expedition: unfavorable winds, storms, the harsh climate, and diseases that decimated the crew (out of 500 people, only 160 reached their destination). Pawłowski traveled from Goa to the fortress of Diu, located 600 km away. Along the way, he made notes on the nature and customs prevailing in India. He was particularly astonished by elephants. He also couldn't understand why Europeans married native women: Even though the same species is black, the Portuguese marry them. And they have half-breed children. This was likely the first description of India by a Pole. Another traveler who was supposed to reach this country was Erazm Kretkowski (1508–1558), the castellan of Brzesko-Kuyavia, traveler, and diplomat. Information about his travels mainly comes from an epitaph written by Jan Kochanowski, which is located on his grave in Padua. According to the text, Kretkowski traveled throughout Europe: He saw the rivers Danube and famous Tagus, and in India, he was (...) where the Ganges flows. Kochanowski even attributed to him the discovery of the source of the Nile, although this information is not true (the discovery of the Nile's source is attributed to John Speke's expedition in 1861).

Other citizens of the Polish-Lithuanian Commonwealth also traveled to Goa, including a certain Gabriel, known only by his first name, and Jan Tregier, who was involved in trade. Crew lists of Portuguese ships suggest that there could have been many more Poles. Names such as Przebicius, Stenislaus, Ochendorco, or Jarzeki may have belonged to citizens of the Commonwealth, although this is not certain. Among them was Jan Bocian, a captain of several ships in Lisbon, originally from Poznań. There is also ample information about residents of Gdańsk traveling to the East. For example, Hans Munkenbeck and an unnamed individual von Holten, both from patrician families, set off for India. Another category of travelers was missionaries, primarily sent by the Jesuit order. One of them was Michał Piotr Boym (1614–1659), who visited India and China.

Poles also ventured to America, as exemplified by Krzysztof Arciszewski, a nobleman sentenced to exile for murder, who settled in the Netherlands after leaving the country in 1623. As a captain of infantry, he participated in a Dutch expedition to Brazil, during which he rose to the rank of admiral. He was probably the only Polish conquistador, so it's no wonder that his character inspired many writers, including Jerzy Bohdan Rychliński (The Adventures of Krzysztof Arciszewski, 1935, Admiral, Devil, and the Gypsy, 1973).

Other Polish travelers in America include Colonel Zygmunt Szop, who served in the Dutch army and became the general governor of Dutch possessions in Brazil from 1646, along with his companion soldier Władysław Konstanty Wituski.

Sometimes Polish historical works also mention Gaspar, a Jew from Poznań (1455–1510). This traveler reached India overland, where he encountered the Portuguese expedition led by Vasco da Gama. He became a guide for the expedition and also converted to Christianity, adopting the name of its commander. Gaspar's story is rarely included in Polish history because he left the Commonwealth in his early youth and chose to become Portuguese.

== Bibliography ==
- Barycz, Henryk (1938). Polacy na studiach w Rzymie w epoce odrodzenia (1440-1600). Cracow.
- Bieńkowski, Tadeusz (1990). Michałowska, Teresa (ed.). Słownik literatury staropolskiej. Wrocław-Warsaw-Cracow: Zakład Narodowy im. Ossolińskich. ISBN 83-04-02219-2.
- Bogucka, Maria (1982). "Zmiany w handlu bałtyckim na przełomie XVI i XVII wieku" [Changes in Baltic trade at the turn of the 16th and 17th centuries]. In Cieślak, Edmund (ed.). Historia Gdańska (in Polish). Vol. II: 1454-1655. Gdańsk: Wydawnictwo Morskie. ISBN 83-215-3244-6.
- Boym, Michał (2009). Kajdański, Edward (ed.). Michała Boyma opisanie świata [Michał Boym's description of the world] (in Polish). Translated by Kajdański. Warsaw: Wydawnictwo VOLUMEN. ISBN 978-83-7233-159-5.
- Bystroń, Jan S. (1932–1933). Dzieje obyczajów w dawnej Polsce. Vol. I–II. Warsaw: Księgarnia Trzaski, Everta i Michalskiego.
- Przyboś, Adam; Żelewski, Roman, eds. (1959). Dyplomaci w dawnych czasach: Relacje staropolskie z XVI-XVIII stulecia. Cracow: Wydawnictwo Literackie.
- Górski, Tadeusz (2008). Dzieje polskiej floty: Od Kazimierza Jagiellończyka do Augusta II Mocnego. Gdańsk: Wydawnictwo L&L. ISBN 978-83-60597-04-0.
- Kowalski, Marek A. (2005). Kolonie Rzeczypospolitej: część I. Warsaw: Dom Wydawniczy Bellona. ISBN 83-11-10285-6.
- Kozakiewicz, Helena and Stefan (1984). Renesans w Polsce. Warsaw: Arkady. ISBN 83-213-3000-2.
- Łoziński, Władysław (1974). Życie polskie w dawnych wiekach. Cracow: Wydawnictwo Literackie.
- Chwalba, Andrzej, ed. (2005). Obyczaje w Polsce, Część II: Czasy Nowożytne. Wydawnictwo PWN. ISBN 83-01-14253-7.
- Pasek, Jan Chryzostom (1987). Pamiętniki. Warsaw: Państwowy Instytut Wydawniczy. ISBN 83-06-01577-0.
- Samsonowicz, Henryk (1982). "Dynamiczny ośrodek handlowy". In Cieślak, Edmund (ed.). Historia Gdańska. Vol. II: 1454-1655. Gdańsk: Wydawnictwo Morskie. ISBN 83-215-3244-6.
- Samsonowicz, Henryk (1976). Historia Polski do roku 1795. Warsaw: Wydawnictwa Szkolne i Pedagogiczne.
- Samsonowicz, Henryk (2014). Złota jesień polskiego średniowiecza. Warsaw: Wydawnictwo Rebis. ISBN 978-83-63795-36-8.
- Sawicka, Zuzanna (2002). Koń w życiu szlachty w XVI-XVIII w. Toruń: Wydawnictwo Adam Marszałek. ISBN 83-7174-839-6.
- Tazbir, Janusz (1979). Spotkania z historią. Warsaw: Iskry. ISBN 83-207-0053-1.
