= Expressway S17 (Poland) =

Road in Poland

Expressway S17
- Droga ekspresowa S17

Route information
- Part of E372
- Length: 195 km (121 mi) 322 km (200 mi) planned

Major junctions
- North end: S 8 northeast of Warsaw (planned)
- A 2 / S 2 east of Warsaw under construction; S 12 merge with S12 near Puławy; S 19 near Lublin; S 12 separation from S12 near Piaski
- South end: Ukrainian border at Hrebenne

Location
- Country: Poland
- Regions: Mazowieckie, Lubelskie
- Major cities: Warsaw, Lublin

Highway system
- National roads in Poland; Voivodeship roads
← S 16	→ S 19

Expressway S17 or express road S17 (pl. Droga ekspresowa S17) is a Polish highway which, when completed, will run from Warsaw through Lublin to the border crossing with Ukraine at Hrebenne/Rava-Ruska.

As of May 2026, 163 km (101 mi) out of planned 310 km (190 mi) are opened to traffic: the main section running from Warsaw through Lublin to Piaski, as well as bypasses of Tomaszów Lubelski and Hrebenne. The section from Piaski to the border with Ukraine is planned to get opened in stages from 2027 to 2031.

== Route ==
Current signage	Expressway section	Length	Opened	Note
	Warsaw eastern bypass: Drewnica – Zakręt	14 km (8.7 mi)	unknown	In planning, timetable unknown due to the environmental permit having been challenged in the courts.
S17	Warsaw eastern bypass: Zakręt – Lubelska	2.5 km (1.6 mi)	2022	
S17	Warsaw Lubelska – Kołbiel	24 km (15 mi)	2020	Opened to traffic in July 2020, construction fully completed in March 2021
S17	Kołbiel – Garwolin	13 km (8.1 mi)	2019	
S17	Garwolin bypass	12.8 km (8.0 mi)	2007	
S17	Garwolin – Kurów	58.6 km (36.4 mi)	2019	
S12 S17	Kurów – Jastków	24.7 km (15.3 mi)	2013	
S12 S17	Jastków – Lublin	7.7 km (4.8 mi)	2014	
S12 S17 S19	Lublin bypass	10.2 km (6.3 mi)	2014	
S12 S17	Lublin bypass	12.8 km (8.0 mi)	2014	
S12 S17	Lublin – Piaski	13.8 km (8.6 mi)	2012	Signed as expressway in 2013
S12 S17	Piaski bypass	4.2 km (2.6 mi)	2004	Signed as expressway in 2013
S17	Piaski - Zamość	77 km (48 mi)	2028 – 2031	Design-build contracts and tenders ongoing
S17	Zamość - Tomaszów Lubelski	23 km (14 mi)	2027	Under construction
S17	Tomaszów Lubelski bypass	9.6 km (6.0 mi)	2021 / 2023	Opened as single-carriageway in 2021 and as dual-carriageway in 2023
S17	Tomaszów Lubelski – Hrebenne	20 km (12 mi)	2027	Under construction
S17	Hrebenne bypass	2.0 km (1.2 mi)	2004	Single carriageway, not signed as expressway. Second carriageway in planning.

== History ==
In December 2009, the bidding process was started for the contracts to build the 66 km (41 mi) section around Lublin, from Kurów to Piaski. It forms the common route of expressways S12 and S17 and includes the east–west bypass of Lublin. The construction of this section started in 2010, with the first 13 km section to be opened to traffic in late 2012 and the rest in 2014.

The section between Warsaw and Lublin was to be finished by 2015, but with subsequent reductions in government spending on infrastructure, the investment was delayed. The section was constructed in the design-build system starting late 2015 and early 2016, and the road was opened to traffic in 2019 and 2020.

The road southeast of Lublin has smaller traffic density and received a lower priority, except for the bypass of Tomaszów Lubelski which was opened in 2021 (first carriageway) and 2023 (second carriageway). In January 2024 contractors were selected to build two sections of the segment between Piaski and Zamość (16,6 km Piaski - Łopiennik; 18,8 km Krasnystaw - Izbica ) with completion planned for 2027. Three sections between Zamość and Hrebenne are currently under construction (Zamość Wschód - Zamość Południe, Zamość Południe - Tomaszów Lubelski, Tomaszów Lubelski - Hrebenne), with completion planned for 2027. Opening of the expressway between Piaski and Ukraine's border is expected from 2027 until 2031 depending on the section.

Planned route of S17 in Warsaw

== Warsaw eastern bypass ==
In Warsaw, the S17 expressway will serve as the eastern bypass of the city. Apart from the southernmost section from Lubelska to Zakręt, which was opened in 2022, the construction timetable is not yet set due to the environmental permit having been challenged in the courts.

== See also ==
- Highways in Poland
