= Expressway S74 (Poland) =

Expressway in Poland connecting Piotrków Trybunalski, Kielce, Sandomierz and Nisko

Expressway S74
- Droga ekspresowa S74

Route information
- Length: 6.8 km (4.2 mi) 215 km (134 mi) planned

Major junctions
- From: S12 near Sulejów (planned)
- S7 near Kielce (planned)
- To: S19 near Nisko (planned)

Location
- Country: Poland
- Major cities: Kielce

Highway system
- National roads in Poland; Voivodeship roads
← S 61	→ S 79

Expressway S74 or express road S74 is planned Polish highway connecting express road S12 near Sulejów and S19 near Nisko. From Opatów it is going to follow the current national road 74 toward Lipnik (where it's going to cross national road 9) and further is going to follow national road 77 toward express road S19 near Nisko.

The first 6.9 km (4.3 mi) long section near Kielce was constructed from May 2009 to December 2011. The rest of the route is planned to be fully completed by 2030.

== See also ==
- Highways in Poland
