= Plug-in electric vehicles in Poland =

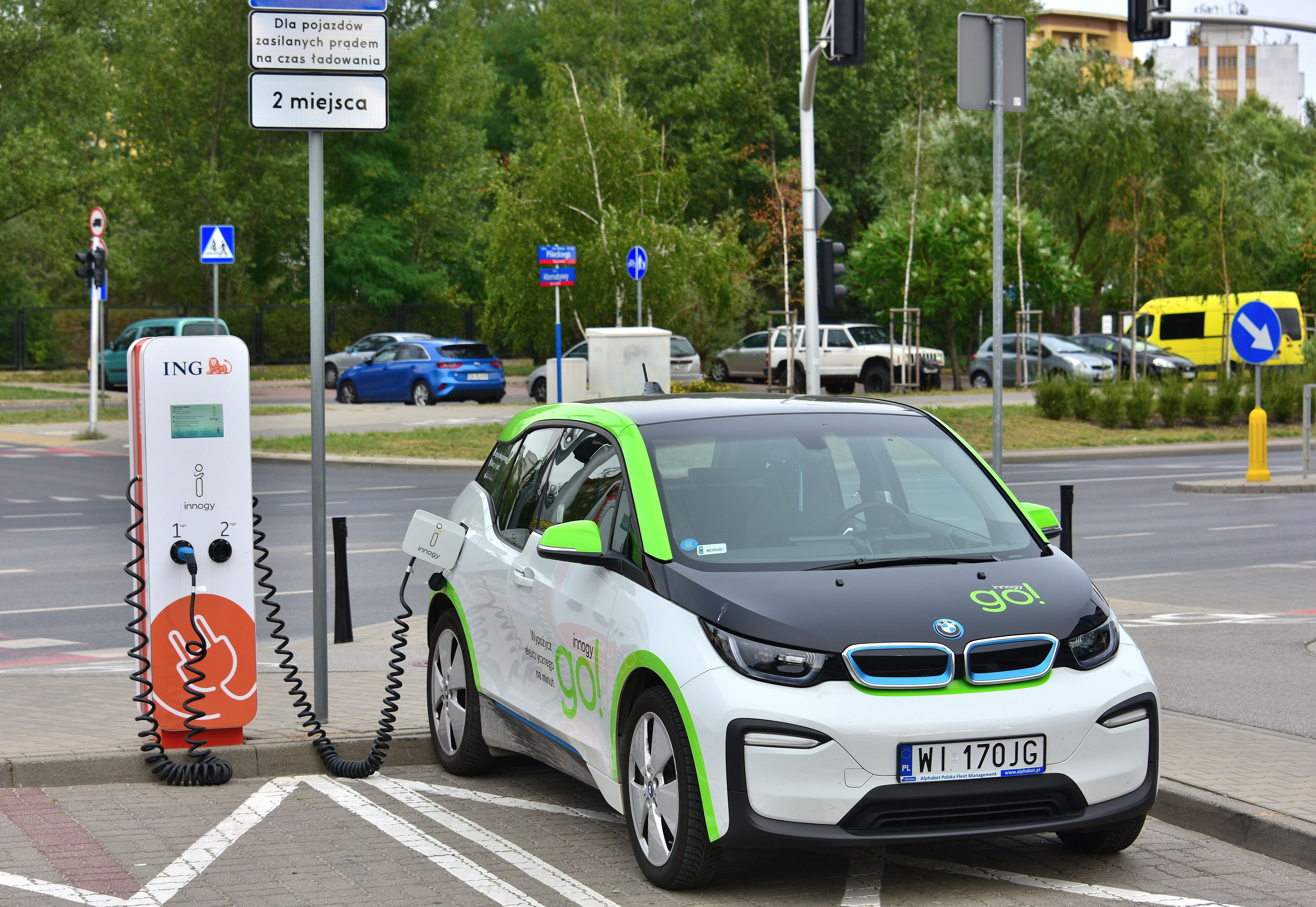
Electric car charging point on Witolda Pilecki Street in Warsaw

As of June 2022 , there were about 23,698 battery electric vehicles and 25,185 plug-in hybrid vehicles in Poland. In January 2022, 4% of new cars registered in Poland were electric or plug-in hybrid.

The Ford Mustang Mach-E was the best-selling electric car in Poland in 2022.

== Charging stations ==
A survey in April 2022 recorded 2,166 public charging station ports in Poland. In September 2022, there were 660 DC charging stations in Poland.

== Manufacturing ==
As of 2020, the first electric vehicle manufacturing plant in Poland is scheduled to open in Jaworzno in 2024.

== Public opinion ==
A 2022 poll conducted by Santander Consumer Multirent stated, 23% of respondents supported having automakers only produce electric vehicles, 47% were opposed, and 29% had no opinion.
