= Expressway S19 (Poland) =

Road in Poland

Expressway S19
- Droga ekspresowa S19

Route information
- Length: 189.5 km (117.7 mi) 570 km (354 mi) planned

Major junctions
- From: Belarusian border at Kuźnica
- S 16 near Knyszyn (planned); S 8 near Białystok A 2 near Międzyrzec Podlaski (planned) S 12 and S 17 near Lublin S 74 near Nisko (planned) A 4 near Rzeszów
- To: Slovak border at Barwinek

Location
- Country: Poland
- Major cities: Białystok, Lublin, Rzeszów

Highway system
- National roads in Poland; Voivodeship roads
← S 17	→ S 22

Expressway S19 or express road S19 (pl. droga ekspresowa S19) is a Polish freeway which has been planned to run from the border crossing with Belarus in Kuźnica, through Białystok, Lublin and Rzeszów, to the border with Slovakia in Barwinek, where it will connect with the future R4 expressway. The road is part of the Via Carpatia route. Its total planned length is 570 km (350 mi).

As of 2026, the 189.5-km long section between Lublin and Rzeszów (including bypasses of both cities) is complete. On the remaining sections the bypasses of several towns are operational, while it is projected that all the remaining parts of the road should be opened to traffic between 2026 and 2032.

During the planning of the road, it was debated how much of it should be dual carriageway and how much single carriageway with 3 lanes in interchanging profile of 2+1 lanes. The first section of the road north of Rzeszów was constructed in such half-profile (with the allocated space reservation for adding the second carriageway later). As the traffic volumes in Poland continued to grow, it was decided that the whole length of S19 will be dual carriageway; the section north of Rzeszów will have the second carriageway constructed by 2026.

== Route in Subcarpathian region ==
In the Subcarpathian Voivodeship, the planned part of the road will run through Babica, Jawornik, Domaradz, (the east of) Krosno, Miejsce Piastowe, Dukla, before reaching the border at Barwinek. It will include new MOP rest areas (parking areas with toilets, sometimes other amenities such as petrol stations and food outlets.) It is a complex project, as the area around is hilly especially after Babica, requiring the construction of three pairs of tunnels. All the land sections are planned to be completed by 2027, while the three tunnels are scheduled to be completed in 2028, 2031 and 2032.

== See also ==
- Highways in Poland
