= Great Lithuanian Route =

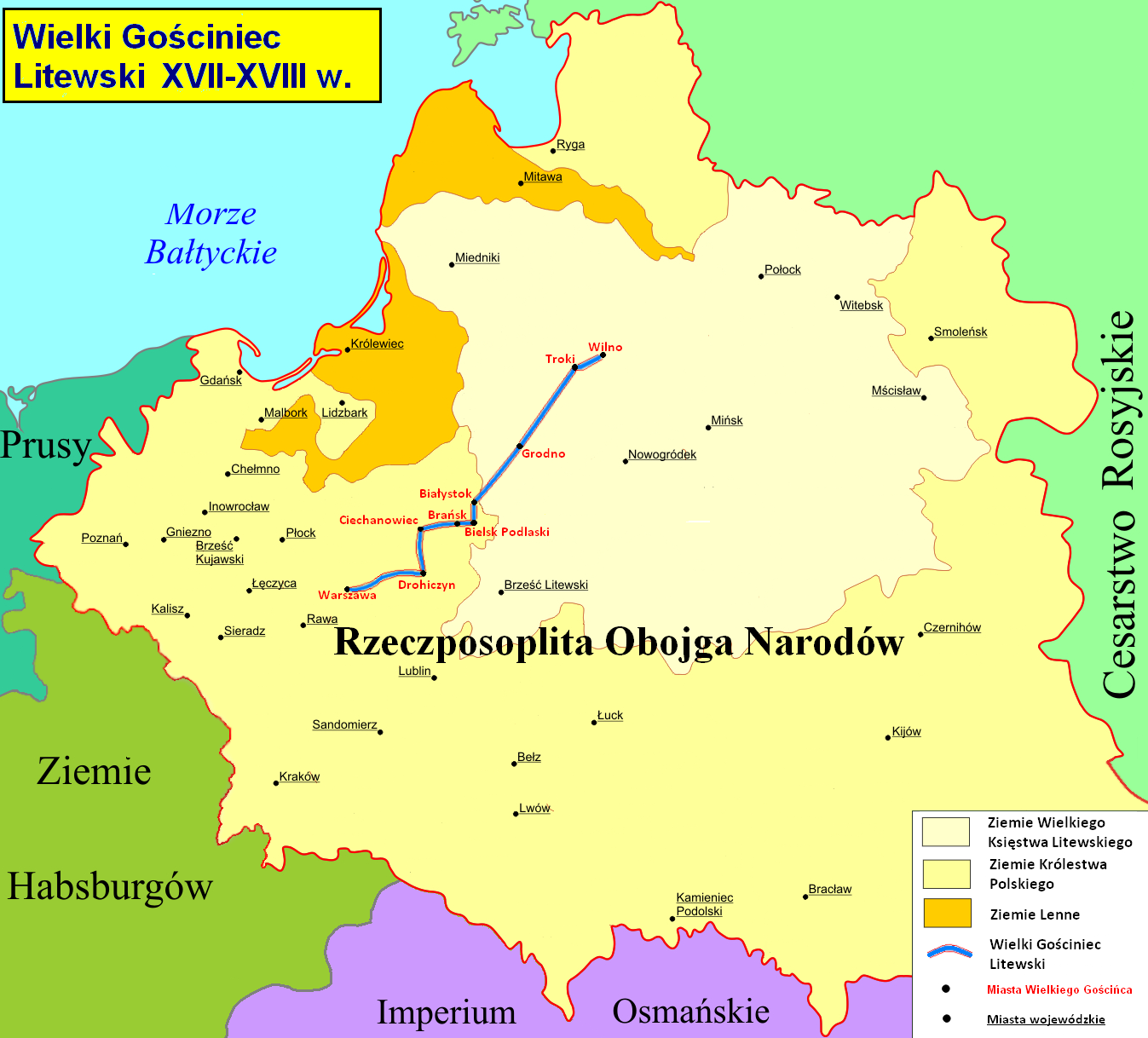
The Great Lithuanian Route

The Great Lithuanian Route (Lithuanian: Didysis Lietuvos kelias, Polish: Wielki Gościniec Litewski) was one of the most important roads of the Polish–Lithuanian Commonwealth. It connected the capital of the Kingdom of Poland, Warsaw, with the capital of the Grand Duchy of Lithuania, Vilnius.

The road ran from Warsaw, through Węgrów, Sokolow Podlaski, Drohiczyn, Ciechanowiec, Bielsk Podlaski, Białystok, and passed through the Lithuanian towns of Supraslė, Sokulka, Gardinas, Druskininkai and Trakai, ending at Vilnius. From the Lithuanian capital, the route continued onwards to Moscow, while Warsaw was connected to most major cities of Central Europe via roads.

The route dates back to the 13th century, but its heyday was in the 18th century, when a regular mail service was initiated during the reign of Augustus II. At that time, permanent postal stations were established along the Great Lithuanian Route. These stations were financed by the towns located along the route.

Several foreign travelers described the Great Lithuanian Route. Among them was Georg Forster, who crossed it in 1784 on his way to Vilnius University.

== Sources ==
- Polska stanisławowska w oczach cudzoziemców, t. 1–2, oprac. W. Zawadzki, Warszawa 1963.
- Słownik Geograficzny Królestwa Polskiego i innych krajów słowiańskich, t. I-XV, Warszawa 1880–1902.
- 400 lat poczty polskiej. Warszawa. 1958.
- Zimowski, L. (1972). Geneza i rozwój komunikacji pocztowej na ziemiach polskich. Warszawa.
- Kazimierski, J., ed. (1982). Dzieje Sokołowa Podlaskiego i jego regionu. Warszawa.
