= Hrebenne, Gmina Lubycza Królewska =

Hrebenne
- Village
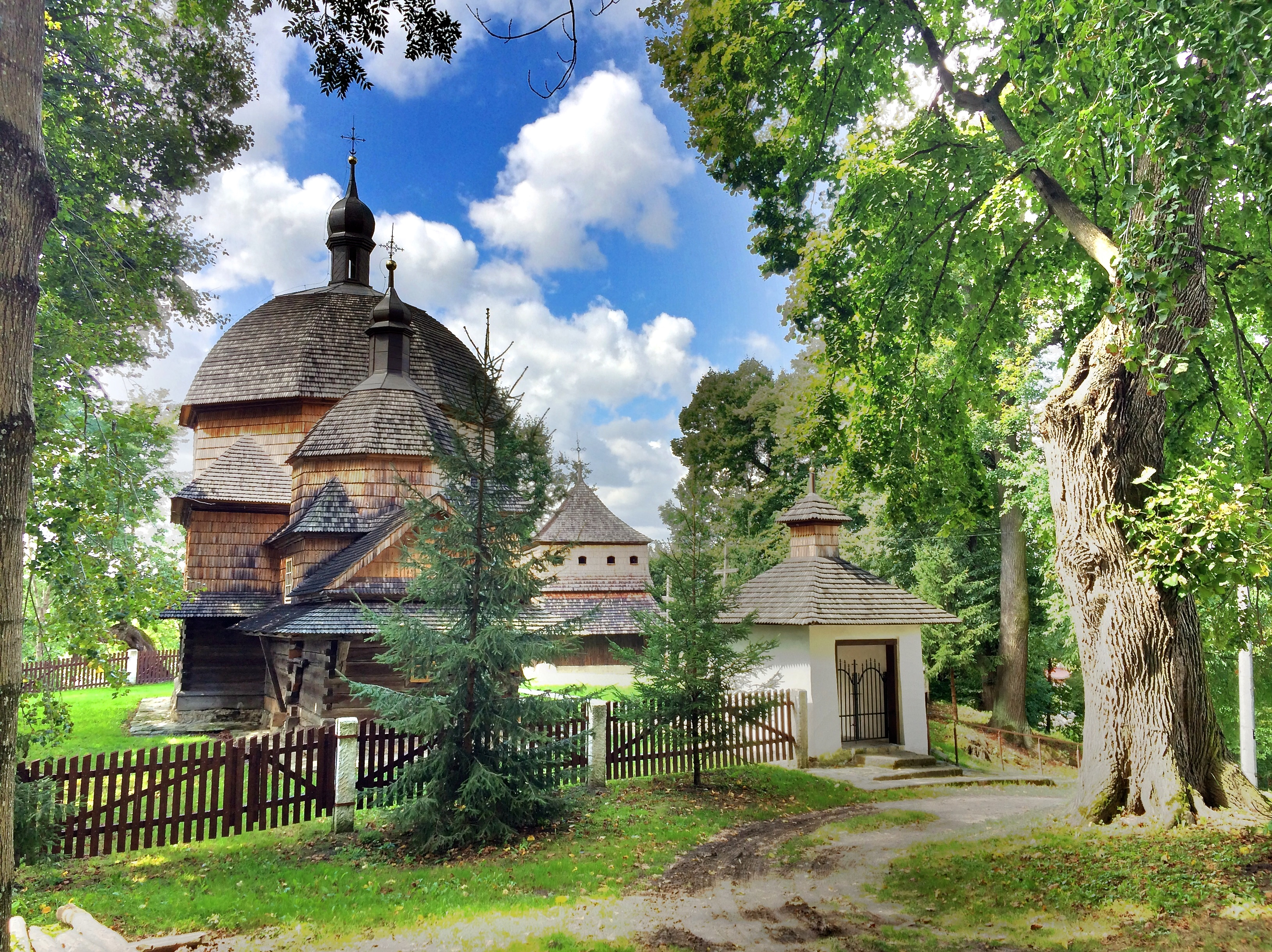
- A former Greek Catholic church, 17th century
- Interactive map of Hrebenne
- Location within Poland
- Coordinates: 50°16′59″N 23°34′34″E
- Country: Poland
- Voivodeship: Lublin
- County: Tomaszów
- Gmina: Lubycza Królewska
- Population: 209

Hrebenne [xrɛˈbɛnːɛ] is a village within Gmina Lubycza Królewska, Tomaszów County, Lublin Voivodeship, in southeastern Poland.
