= Expressway S12 (Poland) =

Road in Poland

Expressway S12
- Droga ekspresowa S12

Route information
- Part of E373
- Length: 89.3 km (55.5 mi) plus 8.6 km single carriageway, 315 km (196 mi) planned

Major junctions
- West end: A 1 near Piotrków Trybunalski
- S 7 near Radom (planned); S 17 merge near Puławy; S 19 near Lublin; S 19 near Lublin; S 17 near Piaski
- East end: Ukrainian border at Dorohusk

Location
- Country: Poland
- Regions: Łódź Voivodeship, Masovian Voivodeship, Lublin Voivodeship
- Major cities: Radom, Lublin

Highway system
- National roads in Poland; Voivodeship roads
← S 11	→ S 14

Expressway S12 or express road S12 (in Polish droga ekspresowa S12) is a Polish highway planned to run from a junction with the A1 highway near Piotrków Trybunalski to a border crossing with Ukraine at Dorohusk, passing by Radom, Lublin and Chełm. The completed road should be about 328 km (204 mi) long.

As of 2024 the section open to traffic runs from Puławy through Lublin to Piaski. The expressway from Piaski to the border with Ukraine is under construction, set to be opened in 2026 and 2027.

== Existing sections ==
- Puławy-Lublin-Piaski section, part of it co-signed with expressway S17, includes the road bypass around Lublin
  - first stage of Puławy bypass (12.7 km (7.9 mi)) with the John Paul II bridge (51.437°N 21.943°E). Opened in 2008.
  - second stage of Puławy bypass to Kurów West, 11.8 km long, opened to traffic on August 22, 2018.
  - Kurów West - Lublin Felin - 55 km long, opened in stages May 2013, September 2014 and October 2014. This section is co-signed with S17.
  - Lublin Felin – Piaski West - 13.8 km built by upgrading existing dual carriageway road, opened as expressway in July 2013. Co-signed with S17.
  - Piaski West - Piaski East (bypass of Piaski) - 4.2 km bypass built in 2004. Co-signed with S17.

== Future ==
A document outlining the future development of transport infrastructure issued by the Polish government in December 2022 projects that the road would be fully completed in 2030, however the majority of the section from Lublin to Ukrainian border will be opened in years 2025 – 2027.

== Possible further extension ==
In April 2026, a Memorandum was signed by 7 Gminas (Leszno, Głogów, Wschowa, Radwanice, Święciechowa, Wijewo and Żukowice) calling for construction of an expressway spanning from Leszno to Głogów, called S12, which would connect expressways S5 and S3. If the proposed plan gets accepted by the Ministry of Infrastructure, the building of this section could start in 2030-2035.

== See also ==
- Highways in Poland
