= Wygoda =

Wygoda or variation, may refer to:

== Places ==
=== Poland ===
- Wygoda, Aleksandrów County in Kuyavian-Pomeranian Voivodeship (north-central Poland)
- Wygoda, Toruń County in Kuyavian-Pomeranian Voivodeship (north-central Poland)
- Wygoda, Gmina Janów Podlaski in Lublin Voivodeship (east Poland)
- Wygoda, Gmina Wisznice in Lublin Voivodeship (east Poland)
- Wygoda, Chełm County in Lublin Voivodeship (east Poland)
- Wygoda, Hajnówka County in Podlaskie Voivodeship (north-east Poland)
- Wygoda, Łomża County in Podlaskie Voivodeship (north-east Poland)
- Wygoda, Łowicz County in Łódź Voivodeship (central Poland)
- Wygoda, Łódź East County in Łódź Voivodeship (central Poland)
- Wygoda, Piotrków County in Łódź Voivodeship (central Poland)
- Wygoda, Radomsko County in Łódź Voivodeship (central Poland)
- Wygoda, Tomaszów County in Łódź Voivodeship (central Poland)
- Wygoda, Wieluń County in Łódź Voivodeship (central Poland)
- Wygoda, Puławy County in Lublin Voivodeship (east Poland)
- Wygoda, Gmina Jędrzejów in Świętokrzyskie Voivodeship (south-central Poland)
- Wygoda, Gmina Imielno in Świętokrzyskie Voivodeship (south-central Poland)
- Wygoda, Sandomierz County in Świętokrzyskie Voivodeship (south-central Poland)
- Wygoda, Garwolin County in Masovian Voivodeship (east-central Poland)
- Wygoda, Lipsko County in Masovian Voivodeship (east-central Poland)
- Wygoda, Łosice County in Masovian Voivodeship (east-central Poland)
- Wygoda, Otwock County in Masovian Voivodeship (east-central Poland)
- Wygoda, Przasnysz County in Masovian Voivodeship (east-central Poland)
- Wygoda, Zwoleń County in Masovian Voivodeship (east-central Poland)
- Wygoda, Żuromin County in Masovian Voivodeship (east-central Poland)
- Wygoda, Żyrardów County in Masovian Voivodeship (east-central Poland)
- Wygoda, Gostyń County in Greater Poland Voivodeship (west-central Poland)
- Wygoda, Kalisz County in Greater Poland Voivodeship (west-central Poland)
- Wygoda, Gmina Kazimierz Biskupi in Greater Poland Voivodeship (west-central Poland)
- Wygoda, Gmina Ślesin in Greater Poland Voivodeship (west-central Poland)
- Wygoda, Krotoszyn County in Greater Poland Voivodeship (west-central Poland)
- Wygoda, Leszno County in Greater Poland Voivodeship (west-central Poland)
- Wygoda, Poznań County in Greater Poland Voivodeship (west-central Poland)
- Wygoda, Silesian Voivodeship (south Poland)
- Wygoda, Opole Voivodeship (south-west Poland)
- Wygoda, Gmina Lipnica in Pomeranian Voivodeship (north Poland)
- Wygoda, Gmina Parchowo in Pomeranian Voivodeship (north Poland)
- Wygoda, Kościerzyna County in Pomeranian Voivodeship (north Poland)
- Wygoda, Starogard County in Pomeranian Voivodeship (north Poland)
- Wygoda, Wejherowo County in Pomeranian Voivodeship (north Poland)
- Wygoda, Kętrzyn County in Warmian-Masurian Voivodeship (north Poland)
- Wygoda, Olsztyn County in Warmian-Masurian Voivodeship (north Poland)
- Wygoda, Ostróda County in Warmian-Masurian Voivodeship (north Poland)
- Wygoda, West Pomeranian Voivodeship (north-west Poland)
- Osiedle Wygoda, Białystok, a district of Białystok

=== Other places ===
- Vyhoda, Kalush Raion, Ivano-Frankivsk Oblast (Ukraine)

== See also ==
- Vigoda (surname)
- Abe Vigoda (band)
