= Sobienie =

Sobienie may refer to the following places in Poland:

- Sobienie Biskupie
- Sobienie Kiełczewskie Drugie
- Sobienie Kiełczewskie Pierwsze
- Sobienie Szlacheckie
- Sobienie-Jeziory
