= Kosumce =

- Village
- Location within Poland
- Coordinates: 51°59′N 21°16′E
- Country: Poland
- Voivodeship: Masovian
- County: Otwock
- Gmina: Karczew
- Population: 280

Kosumce [kɔˈsumt͡sɛ] is a village in the administrative district of Gmina Karczew, within Otwock County, Masovian Voivodeship, in east-central Poland.

From 1975 to 1998 Kosumce was in Warsaw Voivodeship. Voivodeship Road 799 runs through the village.

Neighbouring villages include Dziecinów, Ostrówek and Piotrowice.
