= Kąty, Gmina Sobienie-Jeziory =

Kąty
- Part of the village
- Location within Poland
- Coordinates: 51°54′40″N 21°19′17″E
- Country: Poland
- Voivodeship: Masovian
- County: Otwock
- Gmina: Sobienie-Jeziory

Kąty [ˈkɔntɨ] is part of Sobienie Kiełczewskie Pierwsze village, Gmina Sobienie-Jeziory. From 1975 to 1998 this place was in Siedlce Voivodeship.
