= Kolonia Sobienie Biskupie =

- Part of the village
- Location within Poland
- Coordinates: 51°55′50″N 21°20′0″E
- Country: Poland
- Voivodeship: Masovian
- County: Otwock
- Gmina: Sobienie-Jeziory
- Population: 35

Kolonia Sobienie Biskupie [kɔˈlɔɲja sɔˈbjɛɲɛ bisˈkupjɛ] is part of Sobienie Biskupie village, Gmina Sobienie-Jeziory. From 1975 to 1998 this place was in Siedlce Voivodeship.
