= Kępa Radwankowska, Otwock County =

Kępa Radwankowska
- Part of the village
- Location within Poland
- Coordinates: 51°57′21″N 21°17′54″E
- Country: Poland
- Voivodeship: Masovian
- County: Otwock
- Gmina: Sobienie-Jeziory
- Population: 100

Kępa Radwankowska [ˈkɛmpa radvanˈkɔfska] is part of Radwanków Szlachecki village, Gmina Sobienie-Jeziory. The population is near 100. From 1975 to 1998 this place was in Siedlce Voivodeship. It lies near the Vistula river.
