= Baranówka, Otwock County =

Baranówka
- Part of the village
- Location within Poland
- Coordinates: 51°55′41″N 21°18′18″E
- Country: Poland
- Voivodeship: Masovian
- County: Otwock
- Gmina: Sobienie-Jeziory

Baranówka [baraˈnufka] is the part of Śniadków Górny A village, Gmina Sobienie-Jeziory. From 1975 to 1998 this place was in Siedlce Voivodeship.
