= Brzozowica, Otwock County =

Brzozowica
- Part of the village
- Location within Poland
- Coordinates: 51°56′52″N 21°20′05″E
- Country: Poland
- Voivodeship: Masovian
- County: Otwock
- Gmina: Sobienie-Jeziory

Brzozowica [bʐɔzɔˈvit͡sa] is the part of Sobienie Biskupie village, Gmina Sobienie-Jeziory. From 1975 to 1998 this place was in Siedlce Voivodeship.
