= Celbuda, Otwock County =

Celbuda
- Part of the village
- Location within Poland
- Coordinates: 51°54′00″N 21°17′00″E
- Country: Poland
- Voivodeship: Masovian
- County: Otwock
- Gmina: Sobienie-Jeziory

Celbuda [t͡sɛlˈbuda]is the part of Szymanowice Duże village, Gmina Sobienie-Jeziory. From 1975 to 1998 this place was in Siedlce Voivodeship.
