= Folwark, Otwock County =

Folwark
- Part of the village
- Location within Poland
- Coordinates: 51°59′39″N 21°16′52″E
- Country: Poland
- Voivodeship: Masovian
- County: Otwock
- Gmina: Sobienie-Jeziory
- Population: 120

Folwark [ˈfɔlvark] is a part of Dziecinów village, Gmina Sobienie-Jeziory, Poland. From 1975 to 1998 this place was in Siedlce Voivodeship.
