= Korea, Otwock County =

Korea
- Part of the village
- Location within Poland
- Coordinates: 51°56′00″N 21°19′24″E
- Country: Poland
- Voivodeship: Masovian
- County: Otwock
- Gmina: Sobienie-Jeziory
- Village: Sobienie Szlacheckie
- Time zone: UTC+1 (CET)
  - Summer (DST): UTC+2 (CEST)
- Vehicle registration: WOT

Korea [kɔˈrɛa] is a part of the village of Sobienie Szlacheckie, in Gmina Sobienie-Jeziory, Otwock County, Masovian Voivodeship in central Poland.

From 1975 to 1998 it was administratively located in Siedlce Voivodeship.
