= Łużyce, Otwock County =

Łużyce
- Part of the village
- Location within Poland
- Coordinates: 51°58′30″N 21°16′24″E
- Country: Poland
- Voivodeship: Masovian
- County: Otwock
- Gmina: Sobienie-Jeziory
- Population: 6

Łużyce [wuˈʐɨt͡sɛ] is part of Dziecinów village, Gmina Sobienie-Jeziory, in Poland. From 1975 to 1998 this place was in Siedlce Voivodeship.

The name of the place (probably) comes from local Mazovian word "łurzyce" which means area located near the river ("urzecze" in Polish) and is not connected to the word Łużyce (which means Lusatia) in Polish. It means that etymologically correct spelling of the name of this part of the village is Łurzyce. The name Łużyce is present in official Polish National Register of Territorial Division (TERYT).

From the mid-1970s until 1998, this area administratively belonged to the Siedlce Voivodeship.
