= Sobienie Murowane =

- Part of the village
- Location within Poland
- Coordinates: 51°55′59″N 21°19′23″E
- Country: Poland
- Voivodeship: Masovian
- County: Otwock
- Gmina: Sobienie-Jeziory
- Population: 100

Sobienie Murowane [sɔˈbjɛɲɛ murɔˈvanɛ] is part of Sobienie Szlacheckie village, Gmina Sobienie-Jeziory. From 1975 to 1998 this place was in Siedlce Voivodeship.
