= Kolonia Siedzów =

- Part of the village
- Location within Poland
- Coordinates: 51°54′02″N 21°17′38″E
- Country: Poland
- Voivodeship: Masovian
- County: Otwock
- Gmina: Sobienie-Jeziory

Kolonia Siedzów [kɔˈlɔɲja ˈɕɛd͡zuf] is part of Szymanowice Małe village, Gmina Sobienie-Jeziory. From 1975 to 1998 this place was in Siedlce Voivodeship.
