= Suska, Otwock County =

Suska
- Part of the village
- Location within Poland
- Coordinates: 51°54′54″N 21°17′06″E
- Country: Poland
- Voivodeship: Masovian
- County: Otwock
- Gmina: Sobienie-Jeziory

Suska [ˈsuska] is part of Śniadków Górny A village, Gmina Sobienie-Jeziory. From 1975 to 1998 this place was in Siedlce Voivodeship.
