= Kozorzywie =

- Part of the village
- Location within Poland
- Coordinates: 51°55′6″N 21°19′6″E
- Country: Poland
- Voivodeship: Masovian
- County: Otwock
- Gmina: Sobienie-Jeziory
- Population: 120

Kozorzywie [kɔzɔˈʐɨvjɛ] is a part of Sobienie Kiełczewskie Pierwsze village, Gmina Sobienie-Jeziory. From 1975 to 1998 this place was in Siedlce Voivodeship.
