= Leśniki, Otwock County =

Leśniki
- Part of the village
- Location within Poland
- Coordinates: 51°53′21″N 21°16′06″E
- Country: Poland
- Voivodeship: Masovian
- County: Otwock
- Gmina: Sobienie-Jeziory
- Population: 60

Leśniki [lɛɕˈɲiki] is part of Szymanowice Duże village, Gmina Sobienie-Jeziory.The population is near 60. From 1975 to 1998 this place was in Siedlce Voivodeship. It lies near the Vistula river.
