= Sokołówka, Otwock County =

Sokołówka
- Part of the village
- Location within Poland
- Coordinates: 51°57′36″N 21°18′53″E
- Country: Poland
- Voivodeship: Masovian
- County: Otwock
- Gmina: Sobienie-Jeziory
- Population: 80

Sokołówka [sɔkɔˈwufka] is part of Sobienie Biskupie village Gmina Sobienie-Jeziory. From 1975 to 1998 this place was in Siedlce Voivodeship.
