= Warszówka, Masovian Voivodeship =

Warszówka
- Village
- Location within Poland
- Coordinates: 52°00′N 21°20′E
- Country: Poland
- Voivodeship: Masovian
- County: Otwock
- Gmina: Sobienie-Jeziory
- Population: 330

Warszówka [varˈʂufka] is a village in Otwock County, Gmina Sobienie-Jeziory. As of 2007, the population was 330. From 1975 to 1998, the village was in Siedlce Voivodeship.
