= Radwanków Szlachecki =

- Village
- Location within Poland
- Coordinates: 51°57′N 21°18′E
- Country: Poland
- Voivodeship: Masovian
- County: Otwock
- Gmina: Sobienie-Jeziory

Population
  - Total: 150
- Time zone: UTC+1 (CET)
  - Summer (DST): UTC+2 (CEST)

Radwanków Szlachecki (Polish pronunciation: [raˈdvaŋkuf ʂlaˈxɛtskʲi]) is a village in the administrative district of Gmina Sobienie-Jeziory, within Otwock County, Masovian Voivodeship, in Poland. The population is near 150. It is situated on the Vistula river.

== History ==
Eight Polish citizens were murdered by Nazi Germany in the village during World War II.

== Villages nearby ==
Warszawice, Dziecinów, Sobienie-Jeziory, Sobienie Biskupie.
