= Zambrzyków =

Zambrzyków may refer to the following places in Poland:

- Nowy Zambrzyków
- Stary Zambrzyków
