= Kępa Wysocka =

- Part of the village
- Location within Poland
- Coordinates: 51°54′39″N 21°14′49″E
- Country: Poland
- Voivodeship: Masovian
- County: Otwock
- Gmina: Sobienie-Jeziory

Population
  - Total: 50

Kępa Wysocka ([ˈkɛmpa vɨˈsɔt͡ska]) is a part of Wysoczyn village, Gmina Sobienie-Jeziory. The population is near 50. From 1975 to 1998 this place was in Siedlce Voivodeship.
