= Zuzanów =

- Village
- Location within Poland
- Coordinates: 51°56′N 21°23′E
- Country: Poland
- Voivodeship: Masovian
- County: Otwock
- Gmina: Sobienie-Jeziory

Area
  - Land: 15.09 km^{2} (5.83 sq mi)
- Population: 52
  - Density: 3.446/km^{2} (8.93/sq mi)
- Postal code: 08443

Zuzanów [zuˈzanuf] is a village in Otwock County, Gmina Sobienie-Jeziory, Poland. From 1975 to 1998 the village was in Siedlce Voivodeship.

The population is around 52.
