= Brzezinka, Gmina Sobienie-Jeziory =

Brzezinka
- Part of village
- Location within Poland
- Coordinates: 52°2′45″N 21°17′20″E
- Country: Poland
- Voivodeship: Masovian
- County: Otwock
- Gmina: Sobienie-Jeziory
- Population: 40

Brzezinka (Polish: [bʐɛˈʑiŋka]; sometimes also Brzezinki [bʐɛˈʑiŋkʲi]) is the part of Warszawice village, Gmina Sobienie-Jeziory. The population is near 40. From 1975 to 1998 this place was in Siedlce Voivodeship.
