= Przydawki =

- Village
- Location within Poland
- Coordinates: 51°54′54″N 21°21′11″E
- Country: Poland
- Voivodeship: Masovian
- County: Otwock
- Gmina: Sobienie-Jeziory
- Population: 80

Przydawki [pʂɨˈdafki] is a village in Otwock County, Gmina Sobienie-Jeziory. The population is near 80.

From 1975 to 1998 this village was in Siedlce Voivodeship.
