= Przedwabie =

- Part of the village
- Location within Poland
- Coordinates: 51°52′24″N 21°17′56″E
- Country: Poland
- Voivodeship: Masovian
- County: Otwock
- Gmina: Sobienie-Jeziory
- Population: 40

Przedwabie [pʂɛdˈvabjɛ] is part of Szymanowice village, Gmina Sobienie-Jeziory. The population is near 40. From 1975 to 1998 this place was in Siedlce Voivodeship.
