= Podborek (disambiguation) =

Podborek is a village in Świętokrzyskie Voivodeship, south-central Poland.

Podborek may also refer to:

- Podborek (Piwonin), part of the village of Piwonin in Masovian Voivodeship (east-central Poland)
- Podborek (Śniadków Górny A), part of the village of Śniadków Górny A in Masovian Voivodeship (east-central Poland)
