= Gusin, Masovian Voivodeship =

Gusin
- Village
- Location within Poland
- Coordinates: 51°53′43″N 21°15′36″E
- Country: Poland
- Voivodeship: Masovian
- County: Otwock
- Gmina: Sobienie-Jeziory
- Population: 200

Gusin [ˈɡuɕin] is a village in Otwock County, Gmina Sobienie-Jeziory.

From 1975 to 1998 this village was in Siedlce Voivodeship.
