= Śniadków Dolny =

- Village
- Location within Poland
- Coordinates: 51°55′N 21°18′E
- Country: Poland
- Voivodeship: Masovian
- County: Otwock
- Gmina: Sobienie-Jeziory
- Population: near 250

Śniadków Dolny [ˈɕɲatkuf ˈdɔlnɨ] is a village in Otwock County, Gmina Sobienie-Jeziory.The population is near 250. From 1975 to 1998 village was in Siedlce Voivodeship.
