= Zapole, Otwock County =

Zapole
- Part of the village
- Location within Poland
- Coordinates: 51°57′0″N 21°17′29″E
- Country: Poland
- Voivodeship: Masovian
- County: Otwock
- Gmina: Sobienie-Jeziory
- Population: 70

Zapole [zaˈpɔlɛ] is part of Radwanków Szlachecki village, Gmina Sobienie-Jeziory. From 1975 to 1998 this place was in Siedlce Voivodeship.
