= Śniadków Górny =

- Village
- Location within Poland
- Coordinates: 51°55′N 21°18′E
- Country: Poland
- Voivodeship: Masovian
- County: Otwock
- Gmina: Sobienie-Jeziory

Population
  - Total: 100
- Time zone: UTC+1 (CET)
  - Summer (DST): UTC+2 (CEST)

Śniadków Górny [ˈɕɲatkuf ˈɡurnɨ] is a village in Otwock County, Gmina Sobienie-Jeziory, in the Masovian Voivodeship, in Poland. The population is near 200.

== History ==
Five Polish citizens were murdered by Nazi Germany in the village during World War II.

From 1975 to 1998 this village was in Siedlce Voivodeship.
