= Karczunek, Otwock County =

Karczunek
- Village
- Location within Poland
- Coordinates: 51°54′9″N 21°22′45″E
- Country: Poland
- Voivodeship: Masovian
- County: Otwock
- Gmina: Sobienie-Jeziory
- Population: 40

Karczunek [karˈt͡ʂunɛk] is a village in Otwock County, Gmina Sobienie-Jeziory.

From 1975 to 1998 this village was in Siedlce Voivodeship.
