= Radwanków =

Radwanków may refer to the following places in Poland:

- Radwanków Królewski
- Radwanków Szlachecki
