= Podborek (Śniadków Górny A) =

- Part of the village
- Location within Poland
- Coordinates: 51°55′50″N 21°17′29″E
- Country: Poland
- Voivodeship: Masovian
- County: Otwock
- Gmina: Sobienie-Jeziory
- Elevation: 93 m (305 ft)

Podborek [pɔdˈbɔrɛk] is the part of Śniadków Górny A village, Gmina Sobienie-Jeziory. From 1975 to 1998 this place was in Siedlce Voivodeship.
