= Pilawa =

Town in Masovian Voivodeship, Poland

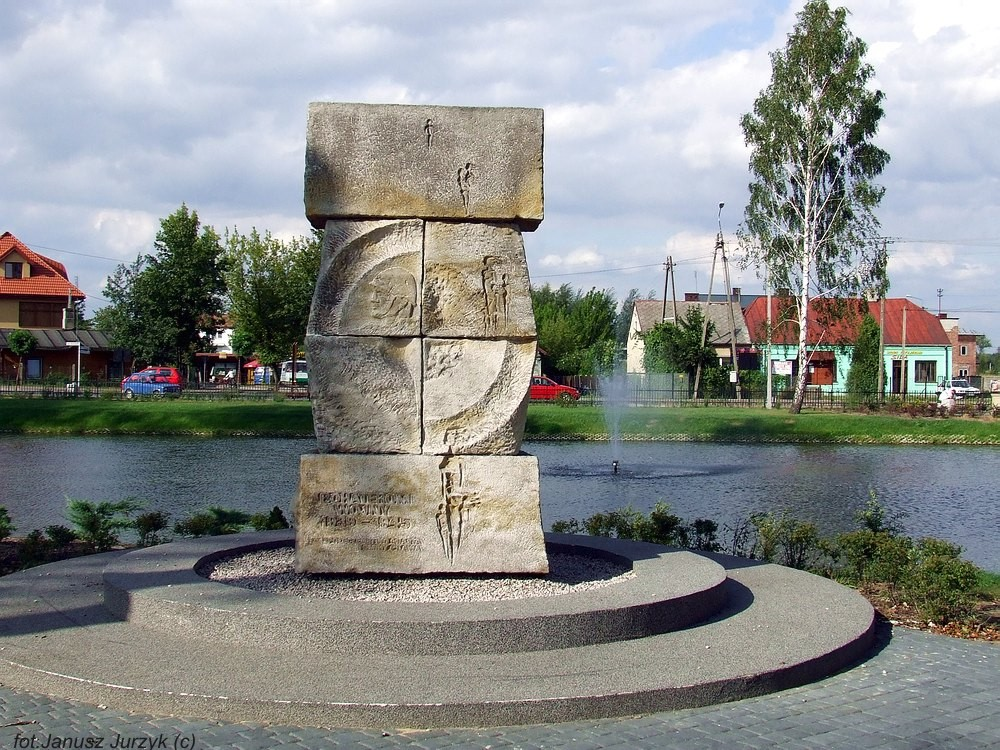
- World War II memorial and pond in Pilawa

- Coat of arms

- Location within Poland
- Coordinates: 51°57′38″N 21°31′56″E
- Country: Poland
- Voivodeship: Masovian
- County: Garwolin
- Gmina: Pilawa
- Town rights: 1984

Government
  - Mayor: Albina Marianna Łubian

Area
  - Total: 6.62 km^{2} (2.56 sq mi)

Population (2006)
  - Total: 4,196
  - Density: 634/km^{2} (1,640/sq mi)
- Time zone: UTC+1 (CET)
  - Summer (DST): UTC+2 (CEST)
- Postal code: 08-440
- Area code: +48 25
- Car plates: WG
- Website: http://www.pilawa.com.pl

Pilawa [pʲiˈlava] is a town in Garwolin County, Masovian Voivodeship, Poland, with 4,121 inhabitants (2004), 59 km (37 mi) southeast of Warsaw.

== History ==
Following the German-Soviet invasion of Poland, which started World War II in September 1939, Pilawa was occupied by Germany. The Polish resistance movement was active in Pilawa. As part of a nationwide campaign to prevent the Germans from plundering Polish forests and exporting timber from Poland, on 24 May 1944, Polish partisans launched an attack on the German guards at the local sawmill. During Operation Tempest, the Home Army seized control of the Pilawa railway station.

Pilawa was administratively located in the Siedlce Voivodeship from 1975 to 1998.

In 2016, town limits were slightly expanded by including parts of the villages of Jaźwiny and Łucznica.

== Transport ==
Pilawa is an important railway junction, it is directly connected to many cities:

- Pilawa-Warsaw
- Pilawa-Dęblin-Lublin
- Pilawa-Mińsk Mazowiecki (inactive)
- Pilawa-Skierniewice (inactive)
- Pilawa-Łuków (inactive)

The Voivodeship road 805 runs through Pilawa, and its junction with the Expressway S17 is located 2 km (1 mi) east from the town.
