= Sewerynów, Otwock County =

Sewerynów
- Village
- Location within Poland
- Coordinates: 51°55′37″N 21°23′52″E
- Country: Poland
- Voivodeship: Masovian
- County: Otwock
- Gmina: Sobienie-Jeziory
- Population: 30

Sewerynów [sɛvɛˈrɨnuf] is a village in Otwock County, Gmina Sobienie-Jeziory.The population is near 30. From 1975 to 1998 village was in Siedlce Voivodeship.
