= Otwock Mały =

- Village
- Location within Poland
- Coordinates: 52°3′N 21°15′E
- Country: Poland
- Voivodeship: Masovian
- County: Otwock
- Gmina: Karczew

Otwock Mały [ˈɔtfɔt͡sk ˈmawɨ] is a village in the administrative district of Gmina Karczew, within Otwock County, Masovian Voivodeship, in east-central Poland.
