= Sobienie Kiełczewskie Drugie =

- Village
- Location within Poland
- Coordinates: 51°55′16″N 21°19′33″E
- Country: Poland
- Voivodeship: Masovian
- County: Otwock
- Gmina: Sobienie-Jeziory

Sobienie Kiełczewskie Drugie [sɔˈbjɛɲɛ kʲɛu̯ˈt͡ʂɛfskʲɛ ˈdruɡʲɛ] is a village in Otwock County, Gmina Sobienie-Jeziory.The population is near 200. In the village is Voivodship Road 801.

From 1975 to 1998 this village was in Siedlce Voivodeship.
