= Rudnik, Otwock County =

Rudnik
- Village
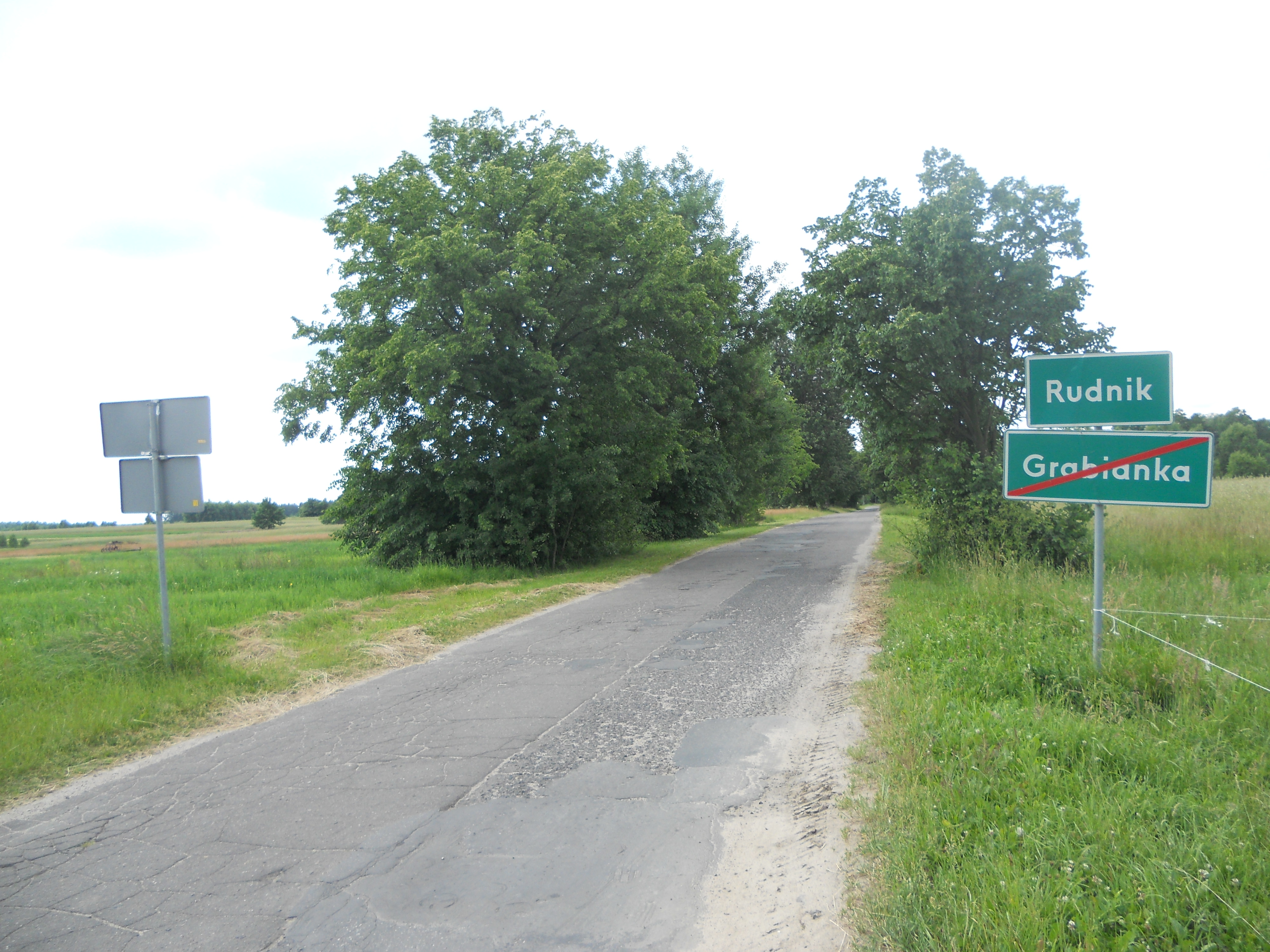
- Road sign in Rudnik

- Location within Poland
- Coordinates: 51°57′40″N 21°27′10″E
- Country: Poland
- Voivodeship: Masovian
- County: Otwock
- Gmina: Osieck

Rudnik (Polish pronunciation: [ˈrudɲik]) is a village in the administrative district of Gmina Osieck, within Otwock County, Masovian Voivodeship, in east-central Poland.
