= Janów, Otwock County =

Janów
- Village
- Location within Poland
- Coordinates: 52°3′40″N 21°16′42″E
- Country: Poland
- Voivodeship: Masovian
- County: Otwock
- Gmina: Karczew

Janów [ˈjanuf] is a village in the administrative district of Gmina Karczew, within Otwock County, Masovian Voivodeship, in east-central Poland.
