= Całowanie =

- Village
- Location within Poland
- Coordinates: 52°1′N 21°19′E
- Country: Poland
- Voivodeship: Masovian
- County: Otwock
- Gmina: Karczew

Całowanie [t͡sawɔˈvaɲɛ] is a village in the administrative district of Gmina Karczew, within Otwock County, Masovian Voivodeship, in east-central Poland.
