= Sobieńki =

Village in Gmina Osieck, Poland

- Village
- Location within Poland
- Coordinates: 51°57′02″N 21°23′55″E
- Country: Poland
- Voivodeship: Masovian
- County: Otwock
- Gmina: Osieck

Sobieńki [sɔˈbjɛɲki] is a village in the administrative district of Gmina Osieck, within Otwock County, Masovian Voivodeship, in east-central Poland.
