= Brzezinka (disambiguation) =

Brzezinka (German Birkenau) is a village in southern Poland, site of the Auschwitz-Birkenau Nazi death camp.

Brzezinka may also refer to:

- Brzezinka, Lower Silesian Voivodeship (south-west Poland)
- Brzezinka, Bytów County in Pomeranian Voivodeship (north Poland)
- Brzezinka, Kraków County in Lesser Poland Voivodeship (south Poland)
- Brzezinka, Gmina Andrychów in Lesser Poland Voivodeship (south Poland)
- Brzezinka, Gmina Brzeźnica in Lesser Poland Voivodeship (south Poland)
- Brzezinka, Gmina Karczew in Masovian Voivodeship (east-central Poland)
- Brzezinka, Gmina Sobienie-Jeziory in Masovian Voivodeship (east-central Poland)
- Brzezinka, Greater Poland Voivodeship (west-central Poland)
- Brzezinka, Strzelce-Drezdenko County, Lubusz Voivodeship (west Poland)
- Brzezinka, Gmina Bobrowice, Krosno County in Lubusz Voivodeship (west Poland)
- Brzezinka, Opole Voivodeship (south-west Poland)
- Brzezinka, Słupsk County in Pomeranian Voivodeship (north Poland)
- Brzezinka, West Pomeranian Voivodeship (north-west Poland)
- Brzezinka, Mysłowice in Silesian Voivodeship (south Poland)
- Brzezinka Średzka
