= Osieck rail crash =

1981 train crash in Poland

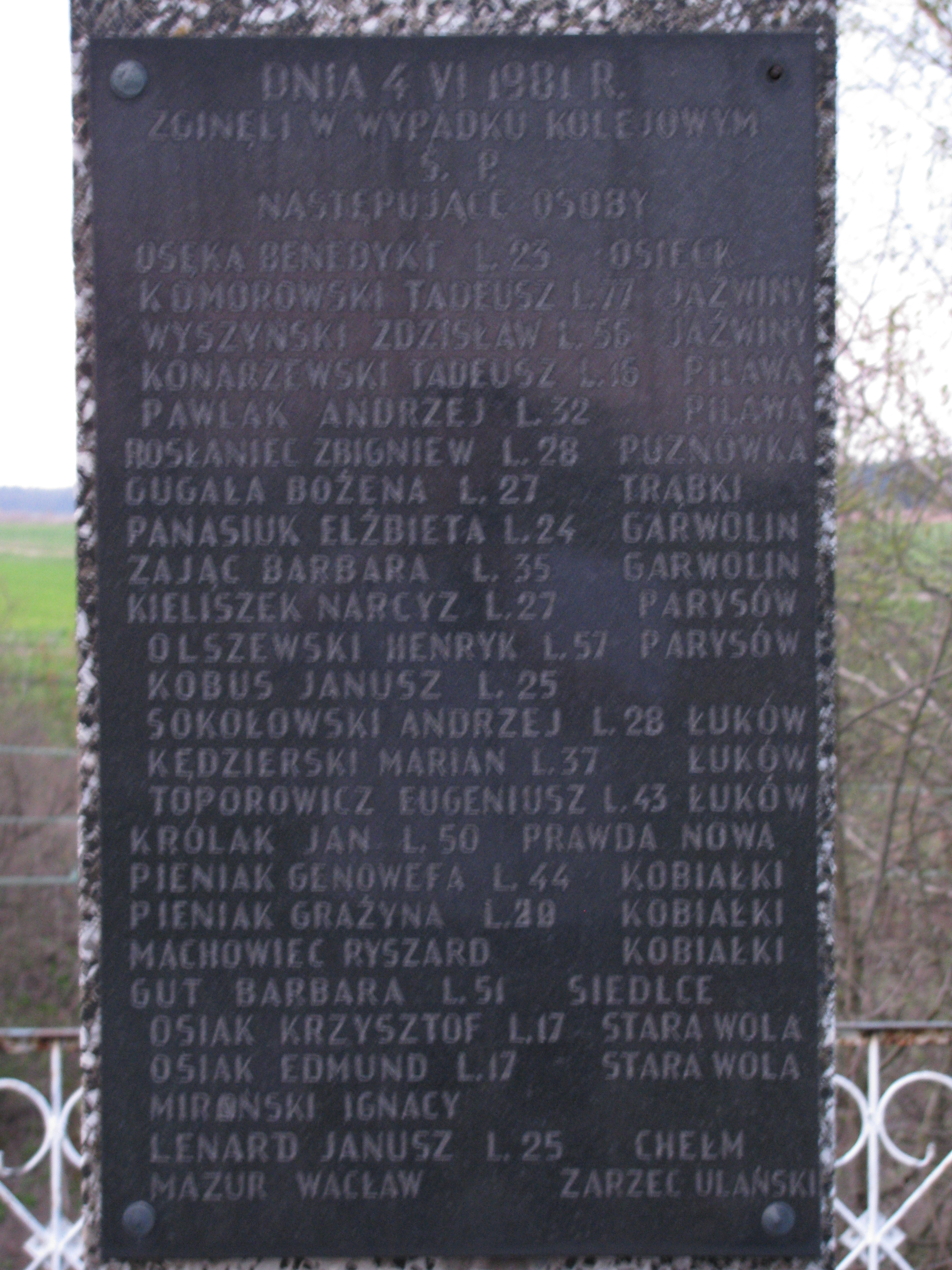
- Memorial with the names of the victims

- Location within Poland

Details
- Date: 4 June 1981 c. 3:45 pm
- Location: near Osieck railway station
- Country: Poland
- Operator: Polish State Railways
- Cause: Signal passed at danger

Statistics
- Trains: 2
- Deaths: 25
- Injured: 8

Osieck rail crash (Polish: Katastrofa kolejowa w Osiecku) was a major railway accident which occurred at 3:45 p.m. on 4 June 1981 near Osieck railway station in Poland. As a result of collision between passenger and freight trains, 25 people died and 8 survivors were injured.

== Accident ==
The crash occurred on a single stretch of line because track maintenance work was being carried out on a second track.

The direct cause of the accident was a signal passed at danger by the engineer of the Skierniewice-to-Łuków passenger train consisting of EN57 electric multiple unit, which left Osieck station without authority. EN57, travelling at 30 mph (50 km/h) collided head-on with the double-headed ironstone-transporting freight train approaching from Pilawa, hauled by an ET41-series electric locomotive. The first coach of EN57 was completely destroyed by the force of the collision.

== Sources ==
- J. Reszka, "Cześć, giniemy! Największe katastrofy w powojennej Polsce", wyd. PAP, 2001
