= Natolin, Otwock County =

Natolin
- Village
- Location within Poland
- Coordinates: 51°55′14″N 21°26′44″E
- Country: Poland
- Voivodeship: Masovian
- County: Otwock
- Gmina: Osieck

Natolin [naˈtɔlin] is a village in the administrative district of Gmina Osieck, within Otwock County, Masovian Voivodeship, in east-central Poland.
