= Nadbrzeż =

- Village
- Location within Poland
- Coordinates: 52°3′5″N 21°13′17″E
- Country: Poland
- Voivodeship: Masovian
- County: Otwock
- Gmina: Karczew

Nadbrzeż [ˈnadbʐɛʂ] is a village in the administrative district of Gmina Karczew, within Otwock County, Masovian Voivodeship, in east-central Poland.
