= Szymanowice Małe =

- Village
- Location within Poland
- Coordinates: 51°52′42″N 21°17′50″E
- Country: Poland
- Voivodeship: Masovian
- County: Otwock
- Gmina: Sobienie-Jeziory
- Population: 150

Szymanowice Małe (Polish pronunciation: [ʂɨmanɔˈvit͡sɛ ˈmawɛ]) is a village in Otwock County, Gmina Sobienie-Jeziory. The population is near 150.

From 1975 to 1998 this village was in Siedlce Voivodeship.
