= Czarnowiec, Otwock County =

Czarnowiec
- Village
- Location within Poland
- Coordinates: 51°55′N 21°25′E
- Country: Poland
- Voivodeship: Masovian
- County: Otwock
- Gmina: Osieck

Czarnowiec [t͡ʂarˈnɔvjɛt͡s] is a village in the administrative district of Gmina Osieck, within Otwock County, Masovian Voivodeship, in east-central Poland.
