= Władysławów, Otwock County =

Władysławów
- Village
- Location within Poland
- Coordinates: 52°1′12″N 21°14′0″E
- Country: Poland
- Voivodeship: Masovian
- County: Otwock
- Gmina: Karczew
- Population: 30

Władysławów [vwadɨˈswavuf] is a village in the administrative district of Gmina Karczew, within Otwock County, Masovian Voivodeship, in east-central Poland.
