= Pogorzel =

Pogorzel may refer to the following places:

- Pogorzel, Mińsk County in Masovian Voivodeship (east-central Poland)
- Pogorzel, Mława County in Masovian Voivodeship (east-central Poland)
- Pogorzel, Gmina Celestynów in Masovian Voivodeship (east-central Poland)
- Pogorzel, Gmina Osieck in Masovian Voivodeship (east-central Poland)
- Pogorzel, Sokołów County in Masovian Voivodeship (east-central Poland)
- Pogorzel, Warmian-Masurian Voivodeship (north Poland)
