= Nowy Zambrzyków =

- Village
- Location within Poland
- Coordinates: 51°54′N 21°20′E
- Country: Poland
- Voivodeship: Masovian
- County: Otwock
- Gmina: Sobienie-Jeziory
- Population: 50

Nowy Zambrzyków [ˈnɔvɨ zamˈbʐɨkuf] is a village in Otwock County, Gmina Sobienie-Jeziory. The population is near 50. In the village is Voivodship Road 801. From 1975 to 1998 village was in Siedlce Voivodeship.
