= Lipiny, Otwock County =

Lipiny
- Village
- Location within Poland
- Coordinates: 51°55′9″N 21°25′27″E
- Country: Poland
- Voivodeship: Masovian
- County: Otwock
- Gmina: Osieck

Lipiny [liˈpinɨ] is a village in the administrative district of Gmina Osieck, within Otwock County, Masovian Voivodeship, in east-central Poland.
