= Wójtowizna, Masovian Voivodeship =

Wójtowizna
- Village
- Location within Poland
- Coordinates: 51°56′32″N 21°25′06″E
- Country: Poland
- Voivodeship: Masovian
- County: Otwock
- Gmina: Osieck

Wójtowizna [vui̯tɔˈvizna] is a village in the administrative district of Gmina Osieck, within Otwock County, Masovian Voivodeship, in east-central Poland.
