= Radwanków Królewski =

- Village
- Location within Poland
- Coordinates: 51°57′N 21°18′E
- Country: Poland
- Voivodeship: Masovian
- County: Otwock
- Gmina: Sobienie-Jeziory
- Population: 60

Radwanków Królewski (Polish pronunciation: [raˈdvaŋkuf kruˈlɛfskʲi]) is a village in Otwock County, Gmina Sobienie-Jeziory.The population is near 60.

From 1975 to 1998 this village was in Siedlce Voivodeship.
