= Kolonia Pogorzel =

- Village
- Location within Poland
- Coordinates: 51°57′30″N 21°24′57″E
- Country: Poland
- Voivodeship: Masovian
- County: Otwock
- Gmina: Osieck

Kolonia Pogorzel [kɔˈlɔɲa pɔˈɡɔʐɛl] is a village in the administrative district of Gmina Osieck, within Otwock County, Masovian Voivodeship, in east-central Poland.
