= Stare Kościeliska, Masovian Voivodeship =

Stare Kościeliska
- Village
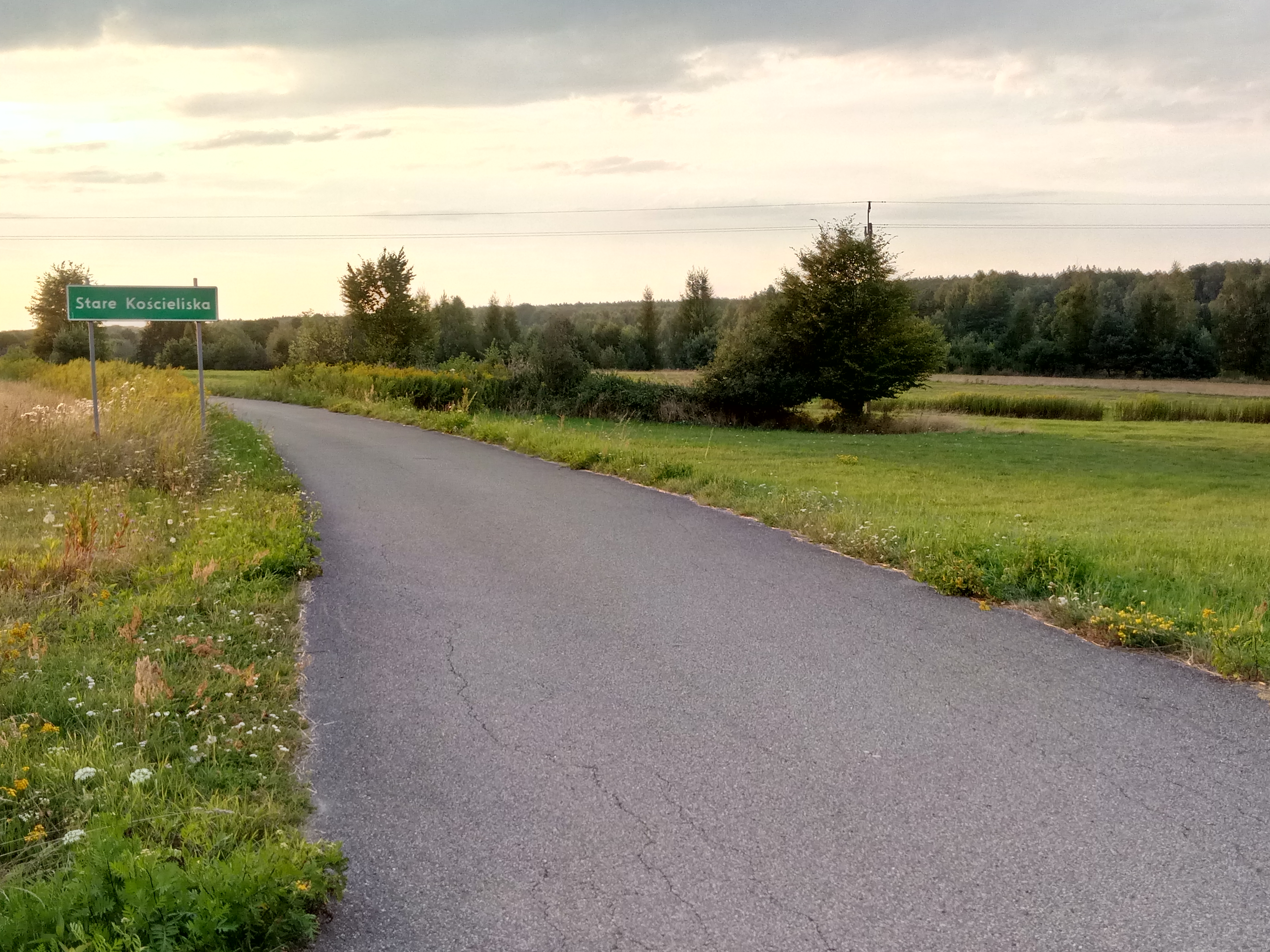

- Location within Poland
- Coordinates: 51°55′16″N 21°27′42″E
- Country: Poland
- Voivodeship: Masovian
- County: Otwock
- Gmina: Osieck
- Time zone: UTC+1 (CET)
  - Summer (DST): UTC+2 (CEST)

Stare Kościeliska [ˈstarɛ kɔɕt͡ɕɛˈliska] is a village in the administrative district of Gmina Osieck, within Otwock County, Masovian Voivodeship, in east-central Poland.

Six Polish citizens were murdered by Nazi Germany in the village during World War II.
