= Łukówiec, Otwock County =

Łukówiec
- Village
- Location within Poland
- Coordinates: 52°2′8″N 21°17′53″E
- Country: Poland
- Voivodeship: Masovian
- County: Otwock
- Gmina: Karczew

Łukówiec [wuˈkuvjɛt͡s] is a village in the administrative district of Gmina Karczew, within Otwock County, Masovian Voivodeship, in east-central Poland.
