= Zapole =

Zapole may refer to the following places:

- Zapole, Pajęczno County in Łódź Voivodeship (central Poland)
- Zapole, Sieradz County in Łódź Voivodeship (central Poland)
- Zapole, Otwock County in Masovian Voivodeship (east-central Poland)
- Zapole, Subcarpathian Voivodeship (south-east Poland)
- Zapole, West Pomeranian Voivodeship (north-west Poland)
