= Kępa Nadbrzeska =

- Village
- Location within Poland
- Coordinates: 52°1′48″N 21°14′9″E
- Country: Poland
- Voivodeship: Masovian
- County: Otwock
- Gmina: Karczew

Kępa Nadbrzeska [ˈkɛmpa nadˈbʐɛska] is a village in the administrative district of Gmina Karczew, within Otwock County, Masovian Voivodeship, in east-central Poland.
