= Wysoczyn, Otwock County =

Wysoczyn
- Village
- Location within Poland
- Coordinates: 51°54′43″N 21°15′54″E
- Country: Poland
- Voivodeship: Masovian
- County: Otwock
- Gmina: Sobienie-Jeziory
- Population: 650

Wysoczyn [vɨˈsɔt͡ʂɨn] is a village in the Otwock County of Gmina Sobienie-Jeziory, in the Masovian Voivodeship. The population is estimated to be around 650.

From 1975 to 1998, the village was in the Siedlce Voivodeship.

Within the borders of Wysoczyn there is the former village of Wysoczyn Nowy (until 1921 Błagodatka).
