= Potok, Gmina Sobienie-Jeziory =

Potok
- Settlement
- Location within Poland
- Coordinates: 51°58′03″N 21°21′02″E
- Country: Poland
- Voivodeship: Masovian
- County: Otwock
- Gmina: Sobienie-Jeziory

Potok [ˈpɔtɔk] is a settlement in the administrative district of Gmina Sobienie-Jeziory, within Otwock County, Masovian Voivodeship, in east-central Poland.
