= Górki, Otwock County =

Górki
- Village
- Location within Poland
- Coordinates: 51°56′59″N 21°26′31″E
- Country: Poland
- Voivodeship: Masovian
- County: Otwock
- Gmina: Osieck

Górki [ˈɡurki] is a village in the administrative district of Gmina Osieck, within Otwock County, Masovian Voivodeship, in east-central Poland.
