= Piwonin =

- Village
- Location within Poland
- Coordinates: 51°57′N 21°17′E
- Country: Poland
- Voivodeship: Masovian
- County: Otwock
- Gmina: Sobienie-Jeziory
- Population: 100

Piwonin [piˈvɔnin] is a village in Otwock County, Gmina Sobienie-Jeziory. The population is near 100. In the village is Voivodship Road 739. From 1975 to 1998 village was in Siedlce Voivodeship.
