= Birkenau (disambiguation) =

Auschwitz II-Birkenau was a Nazi-German extermination camp, near Brzezinka, Poland, within the Auschwitz concentration camp complex during World War II.

Birkenau may also refer to:

- Birkenau (Odenwald), a municipality in the Odenwald in southern Hesse in Germany
- Brzezinka or Birkenau, a Polish village
- Birkenau (painting), a cycle of four paintings by Gerhard Richter

== See also ==
- Brzezinka (disambiguation)
