= Wysocka =

Wysocka is a female Polish surname. Notable people with the surname include:

- Agnieszka Bartczak-Wysocka (born 1981), Polish wheelchair tennis player
- Joanna Wysocka, US-based Polish biologist
- Krystyna Krupska-Wysocka (1935–2020), Polish film director
- Małgorzata Wysocka (born 1979), Polish road cyclist
- Marzena Wysocka (born 1969), Polish discus thrower
- Stanisława Wysocka (1877–1941), Polish actress and theatre director

== See also ==
- Wysocki, another surname, male version
- Kępa Wysocka, village in Poland
