= Grabianka =

- Village
- Location within Poland
- Coordinates: 51°59′N 21°29′E
- Country: Poland
- Voivodeship: Masovian
- County: Otwock
- Gmina: Osieck

Grabianka [ɡraˈbjanka] is a village in the administrative district of Gmina Osieck, within Otwock County, Masovian Voivodeship, in east-central Poland.
