= Brzezinka, Gmina Karczew =

Brzezinka
- Village
- Location within Poland
- Coordinates: 52°2′48″N 21°17′38″E
- Country: Poland
- Voivodeship: Masovian
- County: Otwock
- Gmina: Karczew

Brzezinka (Polish pronunciation: [bʐɛˈʑiŋka]) is a village in the administrative district of Gmina Karczew, within Otwock County, Masovian Voivodeship, in east-central Poland.
