= Szymanowice Duże =

- Village
- Location within Poland
- Coordinates: 51°53′N 21°17′E
- Country: Poland
- Voivodeship: Masovian
- County: Otwock
- Gmina: Sobienie-Jeziory
- Population: 200

Szymanowice Duże (Polish pronunciation: [ʂɨmanɔˈvit͡sɛ ˈduʐɛ]) is a village in Otwock County, Gmina Sobienie-Jeziory. The population is near 200.

From 1975 to 1998 this village was in Siedlce Voivodeship.
