= Gocław, Masovian Voivodeship =

Gocław
- Village
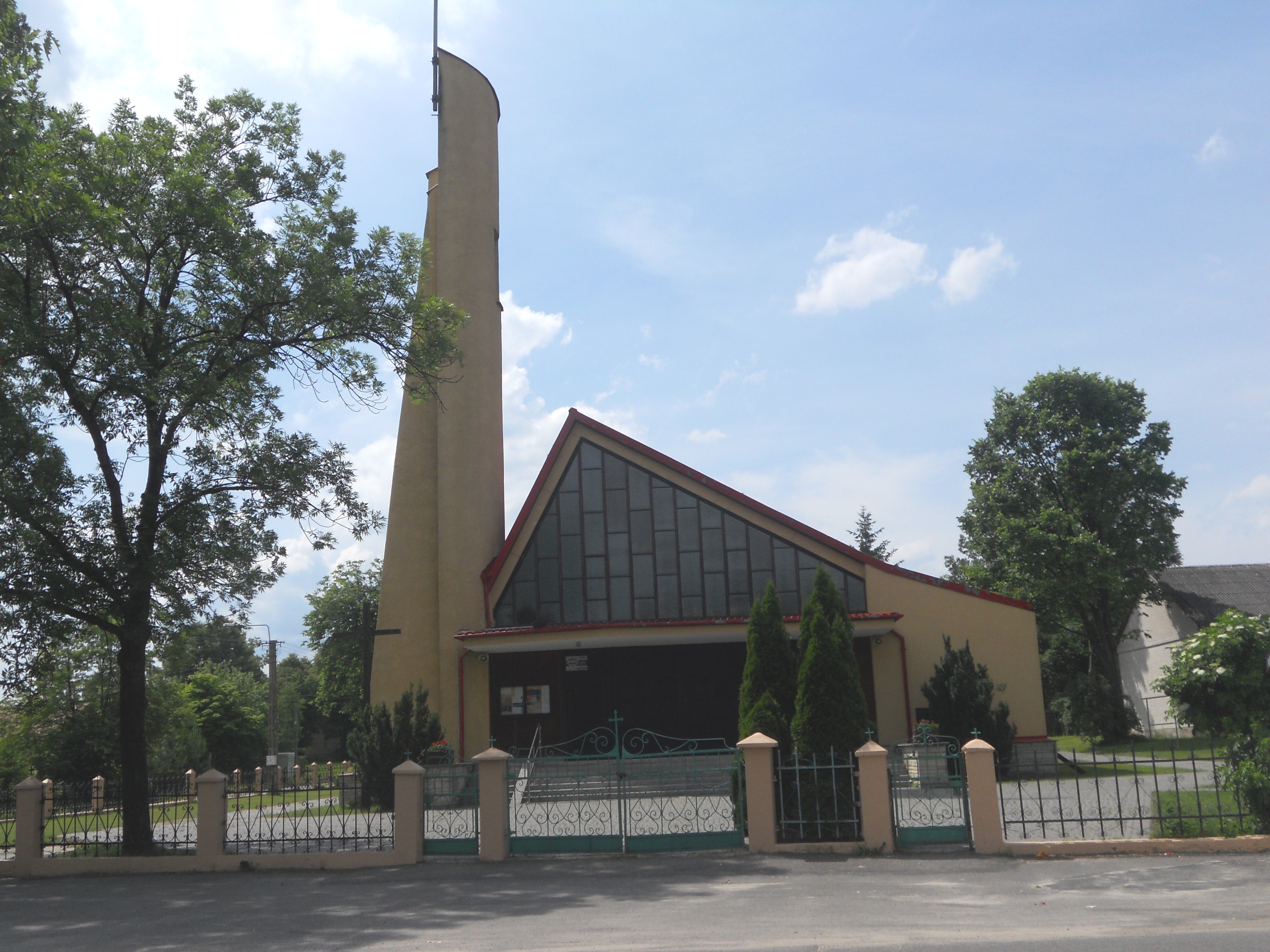
- Church of Virgin Mary Queen of Poland

- Location within Poland
- Coordinates: 52°0′36″N 21°33′17″E
- Country: Poland
- Voivodeship: Masovian
- County: Garwolin
- Gmina: Pilawa

Population
  - Total: 805

Gocław [ˈɡɔt͡swaf] is a village in the administrative district of Gmina Pilawa, within Garwolin County, Masovian Voivodeship, in east-central Poland.
