= Pogorzel, Gmina Osieck =

Pogorzel
- Village
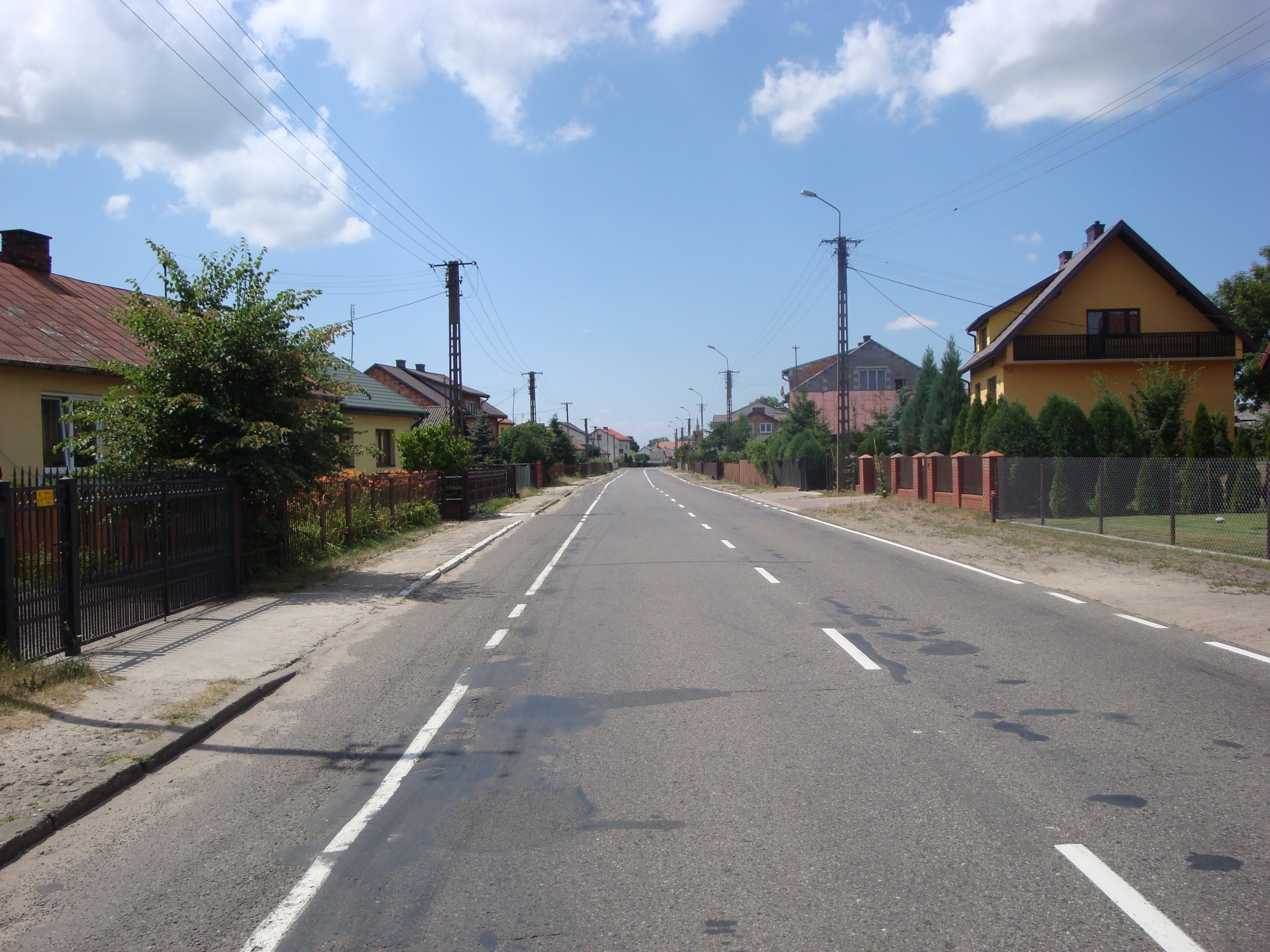
- Street of Pogorzel Osiecka

- Location within Poland
- Coordinates: 51°58′N 21°25′E
- Country: Poland
- Voivodeship: Masovian
- County: Otwock
- Gmina: Osieck

Pogorzel [pɔˈɡɔʐɛl] is a village in the administrative district of Gmina Osieck, within Otwock County, Masovian Voivodeship, in east-central Poland.
