= Żelazna, Garwolin County =

Żelazna
- Village
- Location within Poland
- Coordinates: 52°0′12″N 21°34′41″E
- Country: Poland
- Voivodeship: Masovian
- County: Garwolin
- Gmina: Pilawa

Żelazna [ʐɛˈlazna] is a village in the administrative district of Gmina Pilawa, within Garwolin County, Masovian Voivodeship, in east-central Poland.
