= Puznówka =

- Village
- Location within Poland
- Coordinates: 51°59′N 21°35′E
- Country: Poland
- Voivodeship: Masovian
- County: Garwolin
- Gmina: Pilawa

Puznówka [puzˈnufka] is a village in the administrative district of Gmina Pilawa, within Garwolin County, Masovian Voivodeship, in east-central Poland.
