= Karczew =

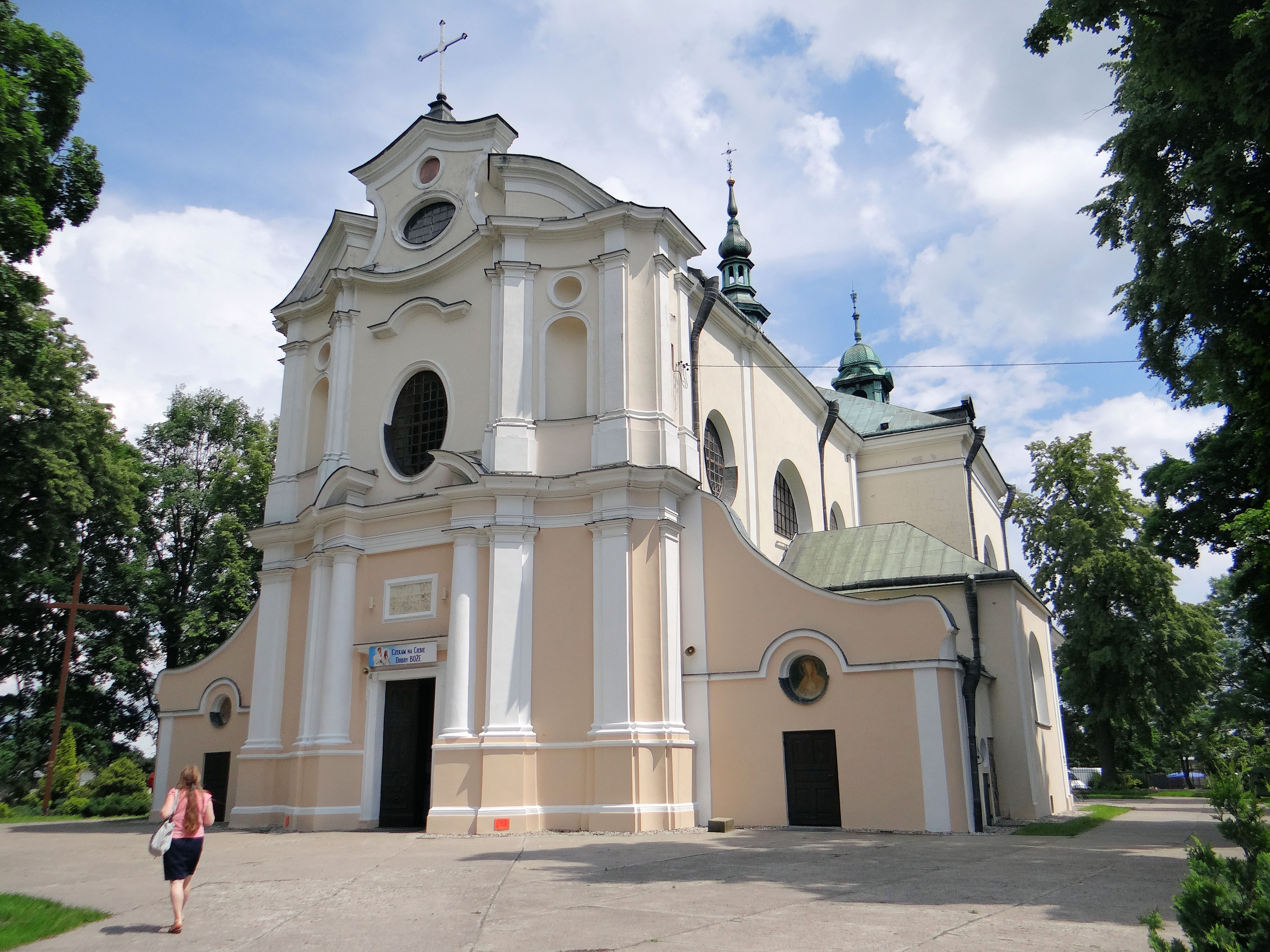
- Polish Baroque Church of Saint Vitus built in 1732–1737 by Jakub Fontana

- Flag Coat of arms

- Location within Poland
- Coordinates: 52°5′N 21°15′E
- Country: Poland
- Voivodeship: Masovian
- County: Otwock
- Gmina: Karczew
- Town rights: 1548-1869, 1959

Government
  - Mayor: Michał Rudzki

Area
  - Total: 29.01 km^{2} (11.20 sq mi)

Population (2010)
  - Total: 10,271
  - Density: 354.1/km^{2} (917.0/sq mi)
- Time zone: UTC+1 (CET)
  - Summer (DST): UTC+2 (CEST)
- Postal code: 05-480
- Area code: +48 22
- Car plates: WOT
- Website: http://www.karczew.pl

Karczew ([ˈkart͡ʂɛf]; Yiddish: קארטשעוו Kartshev) is a town in Otwock County, Masovian Voivodeship, in east-central Poland. It is the seat of the urban-rural administrative district of Gmina Karczew, with 10,271 inhabitants (2010).

Karczew is a part of the Warsaw metropolitan area. It is situated on the right bank of Vistula River.

== History ==
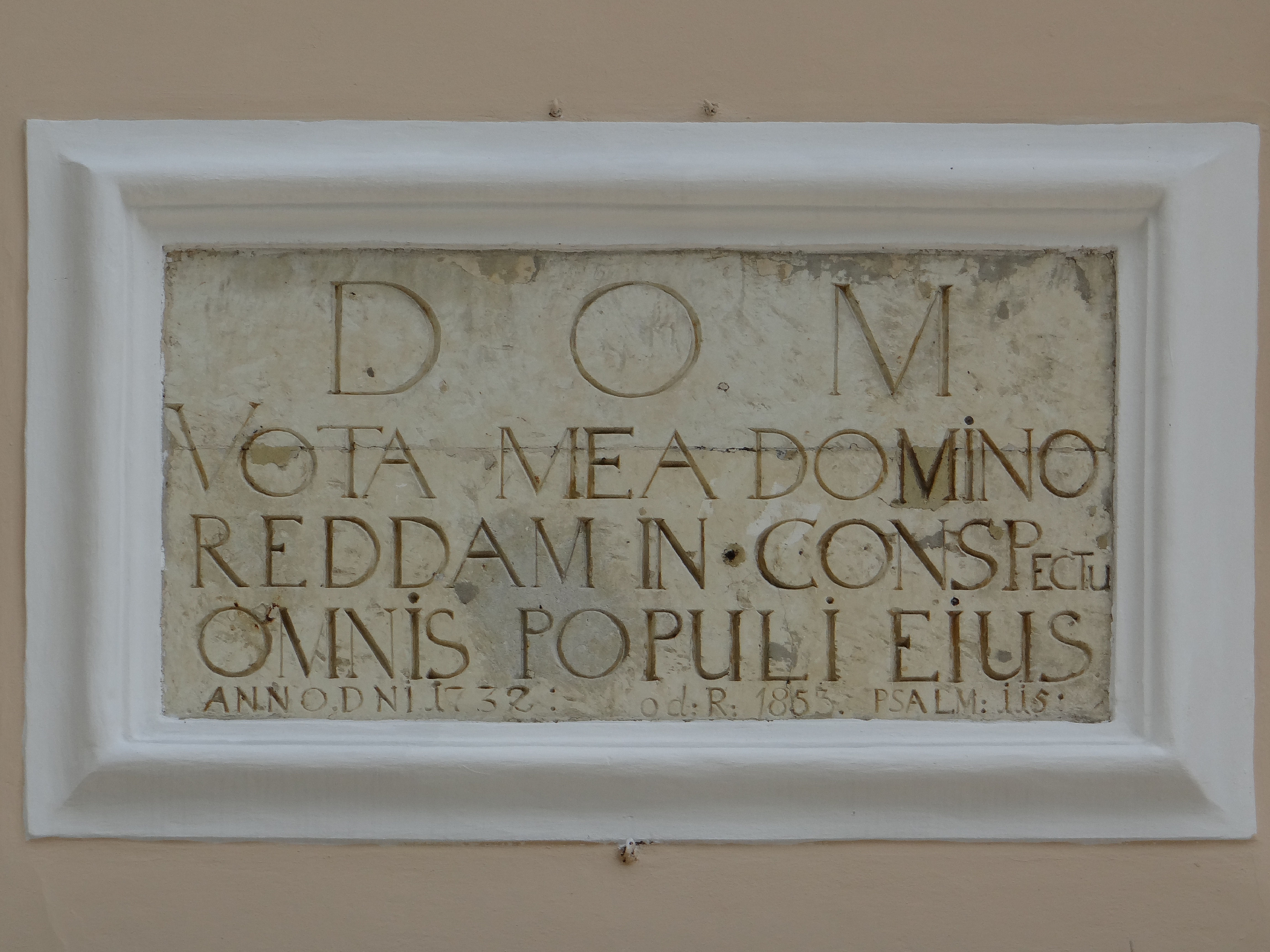
18th-century inscription above the entrance of the Saint Vitus church

Karczew was granted town rights by Polish King Sigismund I the Old in 1548. Administratively it was located in the Masovian Voivodeship in the Greater Poland Province of the Kingdom of Poland.

During the invasion of Poland, which started World War II, Karczew was captured by German troops, who then carried out a massacre of 75 Poles at the local market square on September 11, 1939. Three Poles from Karczew were murdered by the Russians in the large Katyn massacre in 1940.

In 2014 ferries to Gassy started service. According to people working on this project, the main problem was the official "no-entry" car regulation, despite roads being in the vicinity. Without cars it was not economically feasible, and after this problem was solved by removing this rule, the ferries began service.

== Sports ==
The local football team is Mazur Karczew. It competes in the lower leagues.
