= Piotrowice, Otwock County =

Piotrowice
- Village
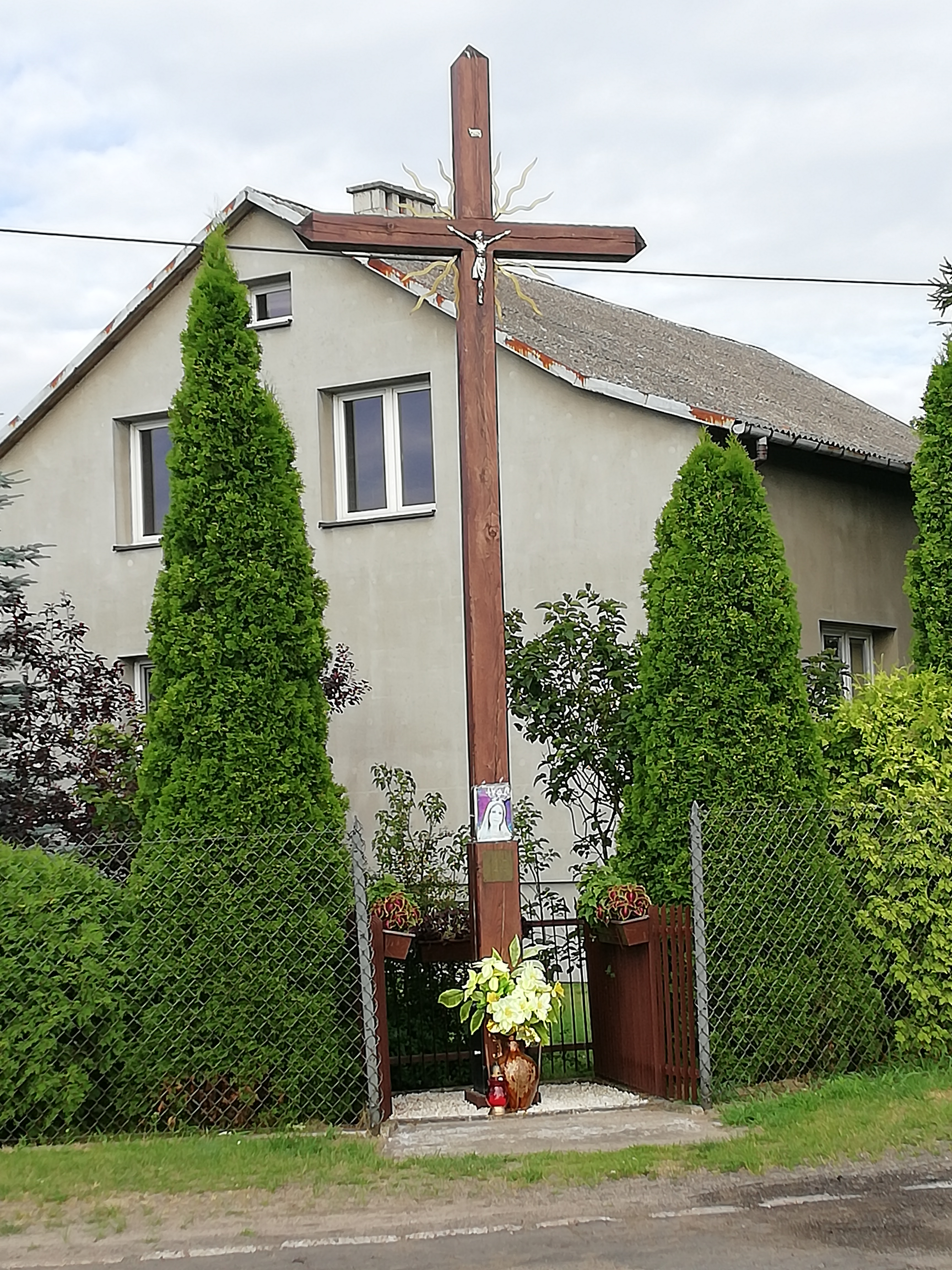
- Wayside cross in Piotrowice

- Location within Poland
- Coordinates: 52°0′15″N 21°16′32″E
- Country: Poland
- Voivodeship: Masovian
- County: Otwock
- Gmina: Karczew

Population
  - Total: 352 (2,013)
- Time zone: UTC+1 (CET)
  - Summer (DST): UTC+2 (CEST)

Piotrowice [pjɔtrɔˈvit͡sɛ] is a village in the administrative district of Gmina Karczew, within Otwock County, Masovian Voivodeship, in east-central Poland.

Voivodeship Road 801 and National Road 50 run through the village.

== History ==
Six Polish citizens were murdered by Nazi Germany in the village during World War II.

From 1975 to 1998, the village was in Warsaw Voivodeship.

== Gallery ==
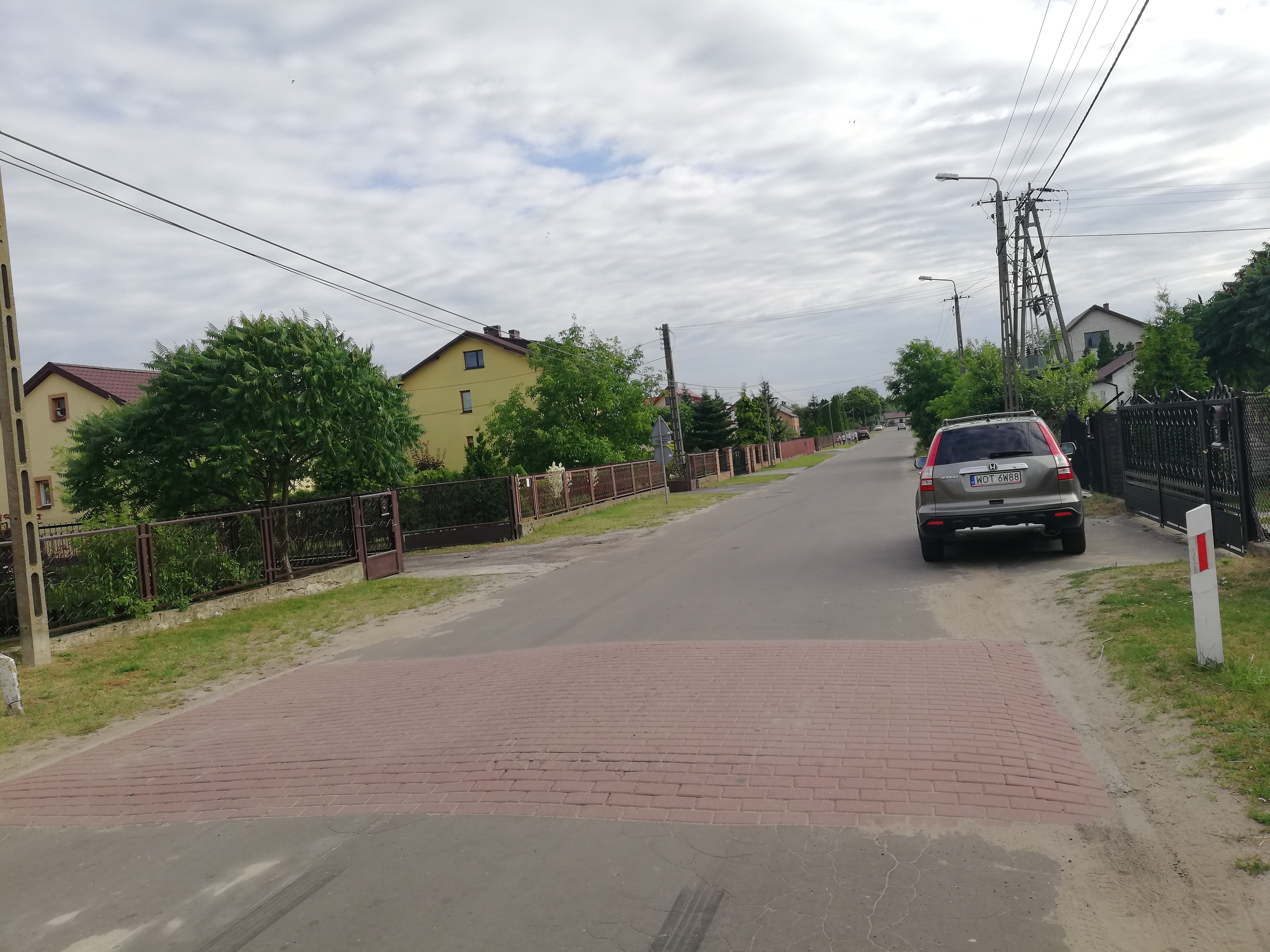
View of Piotrowice

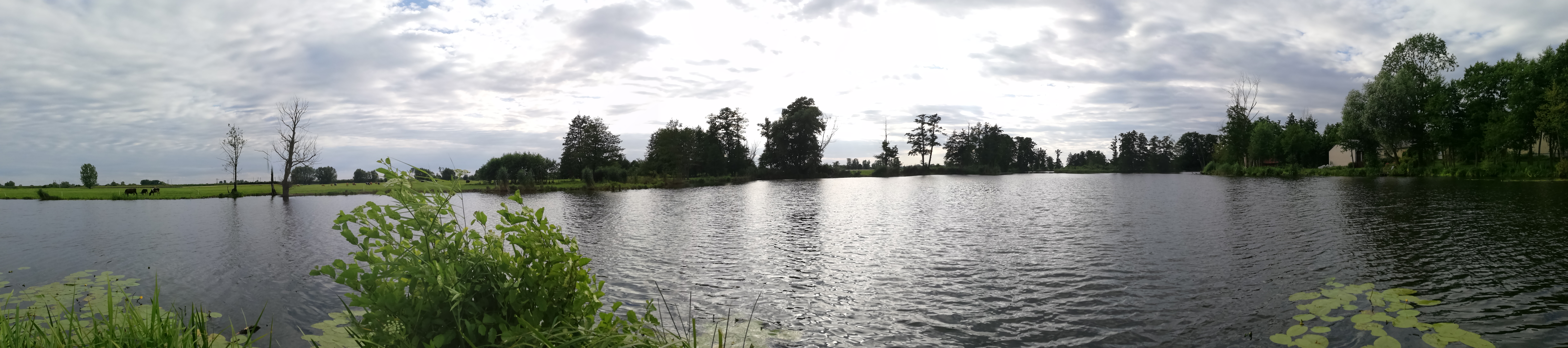
Panorama of lake in Piotrowice
