= Wygoda, Otwock County =

Wygoda
- Village
- Location within Poland
- Coordinates: 52°2′55″N 21°15′49″E
- Country: Poland
- Voivodeship: Masovian
- County: Otwock
- Gmina: Karczew

Wygoda [vɨˈɡɔda] is a village in the administrative district of Gmina Karczew, within Otwock County, Masovian Voivodeship, in east-central Poland.
