= Gmina Sobienie-Jeziory =

Gmina Sobienie-Jeziory Sobienie-Jeziory Commune
- Gmina
- Flag
- Interactive map of Gmina Sobienie-Jeziory
- Coordinates (Sobienie-Jeziory): 51°56′N 21°19′E
- Country: Poland
- Voivodeship: Masovian
- County: Otwock
- Seat: Sobienie-Jeziory

Area
  - Total: 97.37 km^{2} (37.59 sq mi)

Population (2006)
  - Total: 6,229
  - Density: 63.97/km^{2} (165.7/sq mi)
- Website: http://www.sobienie.pl/

Gmina Sobienie-Jeziory is a rural gmina (administrative district) in Otwock County, Masovian Voivodeship, in east-central Poland. Its seat is the village of Sobienie-Jeziory, which lies approximately 19 kilometres (12 mi) south of Otwock and 39 km (24 mi) south-east of Warsaw.

The gmina covers an area of 97.37 square kilometres (37.6 sq mi), and as of 2006 its total population is 6,229.

== Neighbouring gminas ==
Gmina Sobienie-Jeziory is bordered by the gminas of Celestynów, Garwolin, Góra Kalwaria, Karczew, Osieck, Warka and Wilga.

== Villages ==
The gmina contains the villages of Dziecinów, Gusin, Karczunek, Nowy Zambrzyków, Piwonin, Przydawki, Radwanków Królewski, Radwanków Szlachecki, Sewerynów, Siedzów, Sobienie Biskupie, Sobienie-Jeziory, Sobienie Kiełczewskie Drugie, Sobienie Kiełczewskie Pierwsze, Sobienie Szlacheckie, Stary Zambrzyków, Szymanowice Duże, Szymanowice Małe, Śniadków Dolny, Śniadków Górny, Śniadków Górny A, Warszawice, Warszówka, Wysoczyn and Zuzanów.

It also contains the hamlets and village districts of Baranówka, Borki, Brzezinka, Brzozowica, Celbuda, Folwark, Kąty, Kępa Radwankowska, Kępa Wysocka, Kolonia Dziecinów, Kolonia Siedzów, Kolonia Sobienie Biskupie, Korea, Kozorzywie, Kurantówka, Leśniki, Łużyce, Nadjezierze, Podborek (Piwonin), Podborek (Śniadków Górny A), Potok, Przedwabie, Sobienie Murowane, Sokołówka, Strugi, Suska, Wielga, Wielkie Góry Warszewickie, Wieś Kochanka, Zajezierze, Zapole and Zastarze.
