= Trąbki, Masovian Voivodeship =

Village in Masovian Voivodeship, Poland

Trąbki
- Village
- Location within Poland
- Coordinates: 51°57′00″N 21°36′00″E
- Country: Poland
- Voivodeship: Masovian
- County: Garwolin
- Gmina: Pilawa

Population
  - Total: 2,141

Trąbki [ˈtrɔmpki] is a village in the administrative district of Gmina Pilawa, within Garwolin County, Masovian Voivodeship, in east-central Poland.
