= Gmina Pilawa =

Gmina Pilawa Pilawa Commune
- Gmina
- Coat of arms
- Interactive map of Gmina Pilawa
- Coordinates (Pilawa): 51°57′38″N 21°31′56″E
- Country: Poland
- Voivodeship: Masovian
- County: Garwolin
- Seat: Pilawa

Area
  - Total: 77.25 km^{2} (29.83 sq mi)

Population (2006)
  - Total: 10,435
  - Density: 135.1/km^{2} (349.9/sq mi)
  - Urban: 4,196
  - Rural: 6,239
- Website: http://www.pilawa.com.pl/

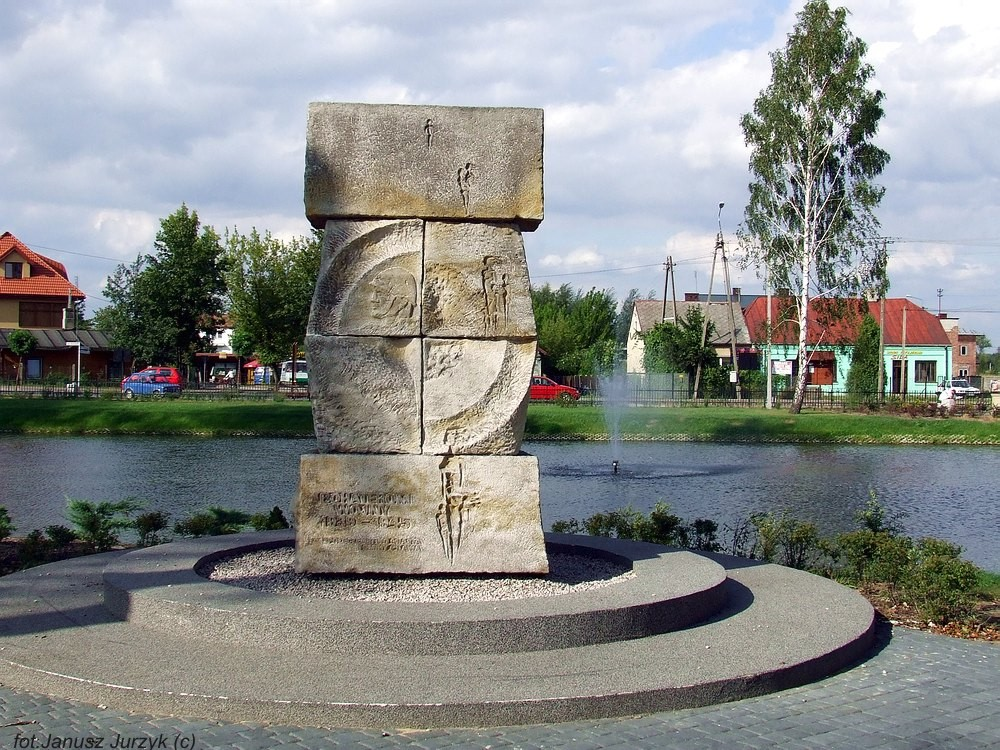
Pilawa

Gmina Pilawa is an urban-rural gmina (administrative district) in Garwolin County, Masovian Voivodeship, in east-central Poland. Its seat is the town of Pilawa, which lies approximately 10 kilometres (6 mi) north-west of Garwolin and 47 km (29 mi) south-east of Warsaw.

The gmina covers an area of 77.25 square kilometres (29.8 sq mi), and as of 2006 its total population was 10,435 (out of which the population of Pilawa amounts to 4,196, and the population of the rural part of the gmina is 6,239).

The gmina contains part of the protected area called Masovian Landscape Park.

== Villages ==
Apart from the town of Pilawa, Gmina Pilawa contains the villages and settlements of Gocław, Jaźwiny, Kalonka, Lipówki, Łucznica, Niesadna, Niesadna-Przecinka, Puznówka, Trąbki, Wygoda and Żelazna.

== Neighbouring gminas ==
Gmina Pilawa is bordered by the gminas of Garwolin, Kołbiel, Osieck, Parysów and Siennica.
