= Gmina Osieck =

Gmina Osieck Osieck Commune
- Gmina
- Flag Coat of arms
- Interactive map of Gmina Osieck
- Coordinates (Osieck): 51°58′N 21°25′E
- Country: Poland
- Voivodeship: Masovian
- County: Otwock
- Seat: Osieck

Area
  - Total: 67.5 km^{2} (26.1 sq mi)

Population (2006)
  - Total: 3,436
  - Density: 50.9/km^{2} (132/sq mi)
- Website: http://gmina.osieck.webpark.pl/

Gmina Osieck is an urban-rural gmina (administrative district) in Otwock County, Masovian Voivodeship, in east-central Poland. Its seat is the town of Osieck, which lies approximately 20 kilometres (12 mi) south-east of Otwock and 40 km (25 mi) south-east of Warsaw. n The gmina covers an area of 67.5 square kilometres (26.1 sq mi), and as of 2006 its total population is 3,436.

The gmina contains part of the protected area called Masovian Landscape Park.

== Villages ==
Apart from the town of Osieck, Gmina Osieck contains the villages and settlements of Augustówka, Czarnowiec, Górki, Grabianka, Kolonia Osieck, Kolonia Pogorzel, Lipiny, Natolin, Nowe Kościeliska, Pogorzel, Rudnik, Sobieńki, Stare Kościeliska and Wójtowizna.

== Neighbouring gminas ==
Gmina Osieck is bordered by the gminas of Celestynów, Garwolin, Kołbiel, Pilawa and Sobienie-Jeziory.
