= Kalonka, Masovian Voivodeship =

Kalonka
- Village
- Location within Poland
- Coordinates: 52°1′11″N 21°35′45″E
- Country: Poland
- Voivodeship: Masovian
- County: Garwolin
- Gmina: Pilawa
- Population (approx.): 270

Kalonka [kaˈlɔnka] is a village in the administrative district of Gmina Pilawa, within Garwolin County, Masovian Voivodeship, in east-central Poland.
