= Lipówki, Masovian Voivodeship =

Lipówki
- Village
- Location within Poland
- Coordinates: 51°57′27″N 21°33′33″E
- Country: Poland
- Voivodeship: Masovian
- County: Garwolin
- Gmina: Pilawa
- Population (approx.): 750

Lipówki [liˈpufki] is a village in the administrative district of Gmina Pilawa, within Garwolin County, Masovian Voivodeship, in east-central Poland.
