= Ostrówek, Otwock County =

Ostrówek
- Village
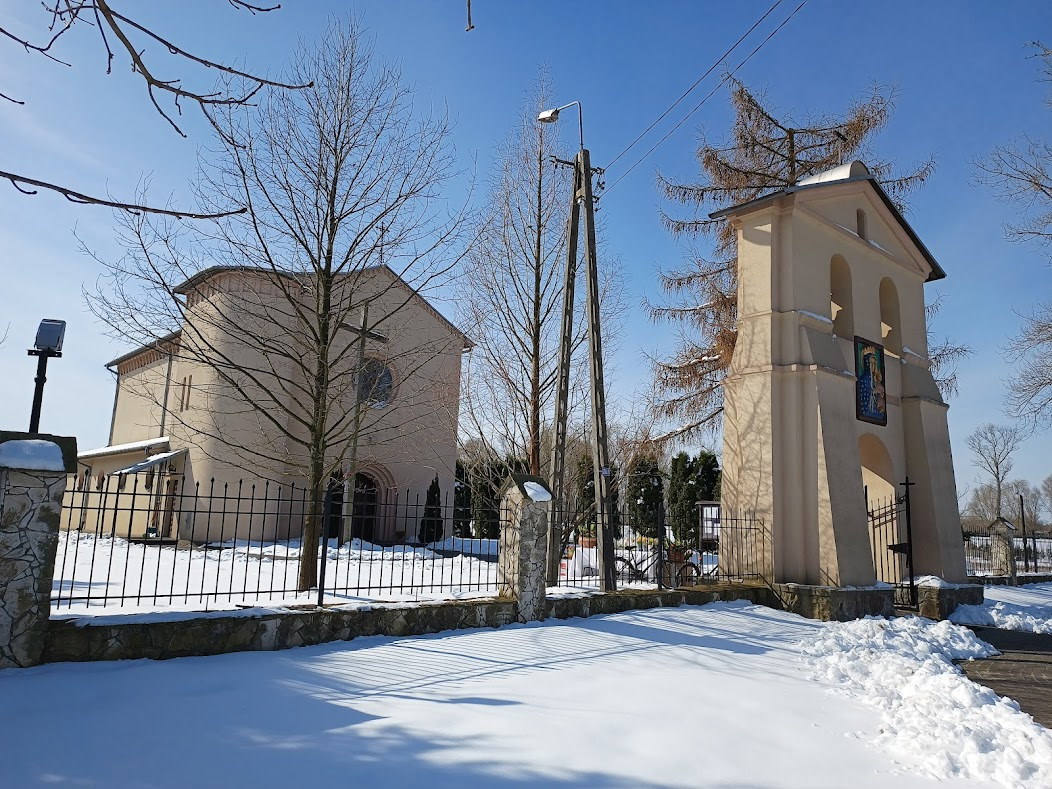
- Saint Isidore church in Ostrówek

- Location within Poland
- Coordinates: 51°59′38″N 21°14′35″E
- Country: Poland
- Voivodeship: Masovian
- County: Otwock
- Gmina: Karczew

Population
  - Total: 160
- Time zone: UTC+1 (CET)
  - Summer (DST): UTC+2 (CEST)

Ostrówek [ɔsˈtruvɛk] is a village in the administrative district of Gmina Karczew, within Otwock County, Masovian Voivodeship, in east-central Poland.

Five Polish citizens were murdered by Nazi Germany in the village during World War II.
