= Osieck =

- Town
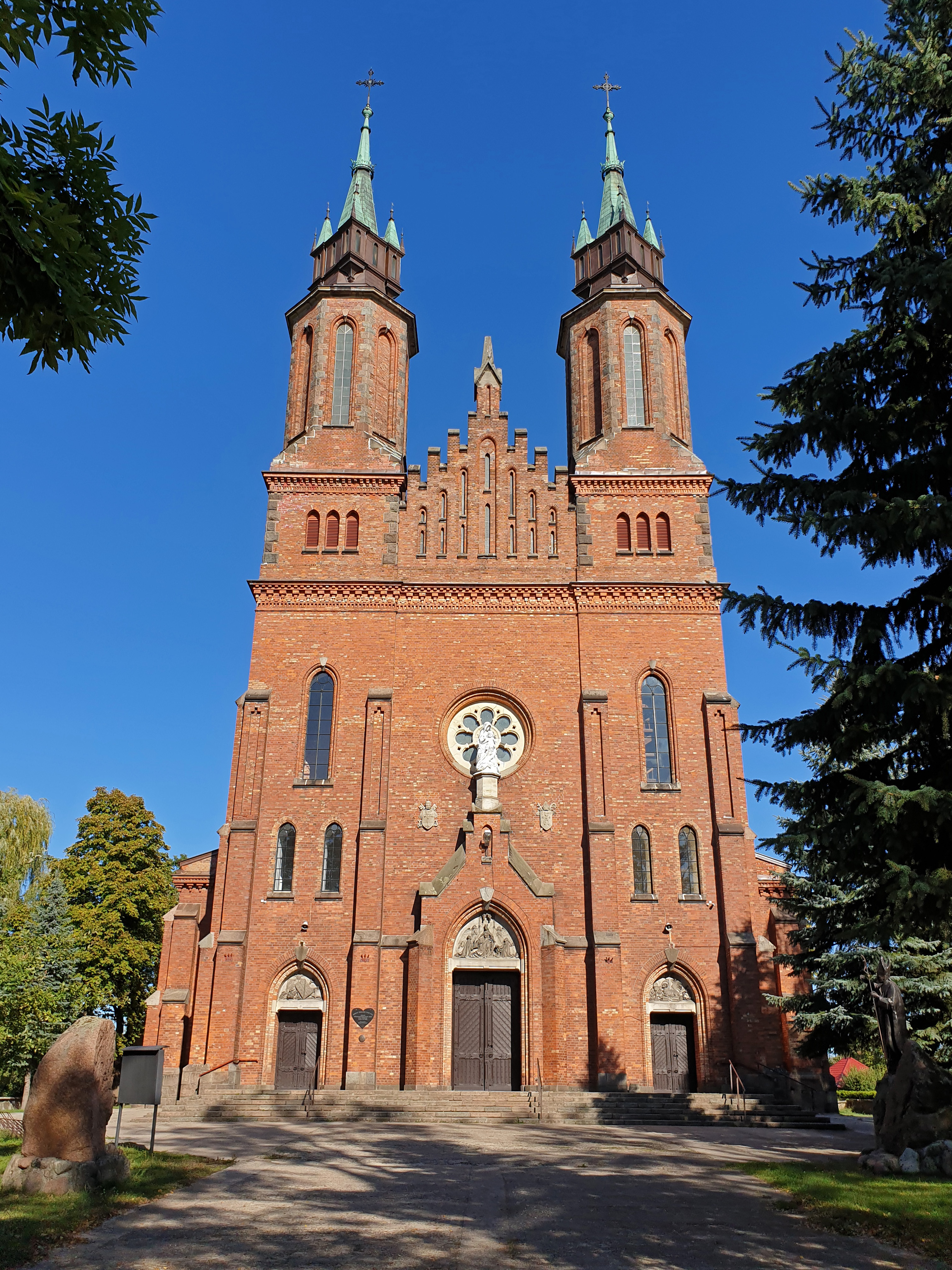
- Saint Andrew and Saint Bartholomew church in Osieck

- Flag Coat of arms

- Location within Poland
- Coordinates: 51°58′N 21°25′E
- Country: Poland
- Voivodeship: Masovian
- County: Otwock
- Gmina: Osieck

Population
  - Total: 920
- Time zone: UTC+1 (CET)
  - Summer (DST): UTC+2 (CEST)
- Vehicle registration: WOT

Osieck [ˈɔɕɛt͡sk] is a town in Otwock County, Masovian Voivodeship, in east-central Poland. It is the seat of the gmina (administrative district) called Gmina Osieck.

== History ==
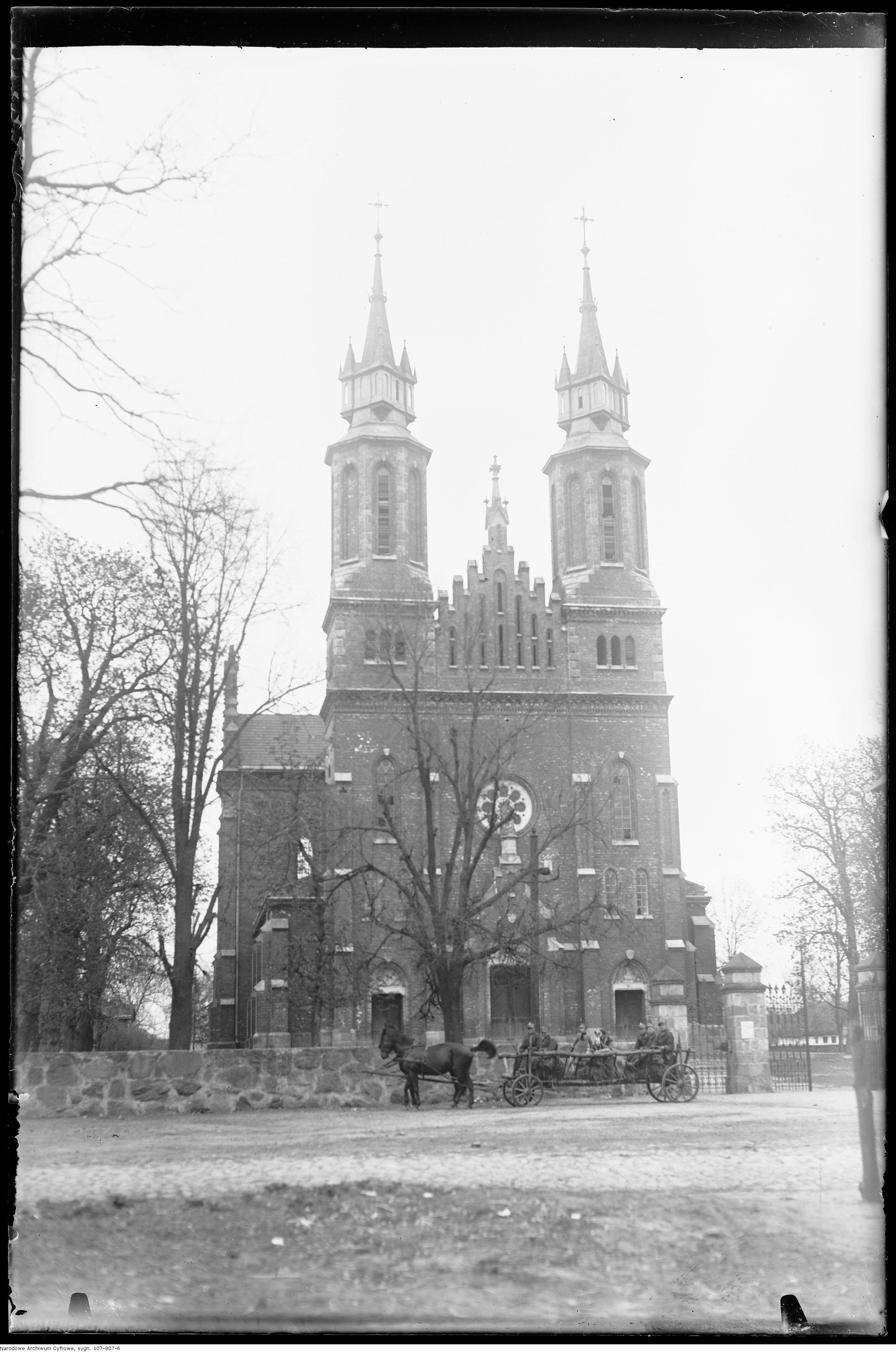
Saint Andrew and Saint Bartholomew church in 1937

Osieck was the location of a hunting lodge of the Dukes of Mazovia of the Piast dynasty, and the place of death of Duke Konrad III Rudy in 1503. Osieck was granted town rights in 1558 by King Sigismund II Augustus. It was a royal town of the Kingdom of Poland, administratively located in the Masovian Voivodeship in the Greater Poland Province. King Sigismund III Vasa and the Royal Court stayed in Osieck during the epidemics of 1625, 1629 and 1630. The town's prosperity was halted by the Swedish invasion in 1655.

After the Third Partition of Poland in 1795, it was annexed by Austria. After the Polish victory in the Austro-Polish War of 1809, it became part of the short-lived Duchy of Warsaw, and after the duchy's dissolution in 1815, it passed to the Russian Partition of Poland. Osieck was deprived of its town rights by the Tsar on June 1, 1869, which was a way to punish the city for the participation of its inhabitants in the January Uprising. After World War I, Poland regained independence and control of Osieck.

Following the joint German-Soviet invasion of Poland, which started World War II in September 1939, the town was occupied by Germany.

On 4 June 1981, a collision between two trains occurred near Osieck, killing 25 people.

On 1 January 2024 after 155 years Osieck regained its town rights.
