= Gmina Karczew =

Gmina Karczew Karczew Commune
- Gmina
- Flag Coat of arms
- Interactive map of Gmina Karczew
- Coordinates (Karczew): 52°5′N 21°15′E
- Country: Poland
- Voivodeship: Masovian
- County: Otwock
- Seat: Karczew

Area
  - Total: 81.49 km^{2} (31.46 sq mi)

Population (2006)
  - Total: 15,919
  - Density: 195.3/km^{2} (506.0/sq mi)
  - Urban: 10,396
  - Rural: 5,523
- Website: http://www.karczew.pl

Gmina Karczew is an urban-rural gmina (administrative district) in Otwock County, Masovian Voivodeship, in east-central Poland. Its seat is the town of Karczew, which lies approximately 4 kilometres (2 mi) south of Otwock and 23 km (14 mi) south-east of Warsaw.

The gmina covers an area of 81.49 square kilometres (31.5 sq mi), and as of 2006 its total population is 15,919 (out of which the population of Karczew amounts to 10,396, and the population of the rural part of the gmina is 5,523).

The gmina contains part of the protected area called Masovian Landscape Park.

== Villages ==
Apart from the town of Karczew, Gmina Karczew contains the villages and settlements of Brzezinka, Całowanie, Glinki, Janów, Kępa Nadbrzeska, Kosumce, Łukówiec, Nadbrzeż, Ostrówek, Ostrówiec, Otwock Mały, Otwock Wielki, Piotrowice, Sobiekursk, Władysławów and Wygoda.

== Neighbouring gminas ==
Gmina Karczew is bordered by the town of Otwock and by the gminas of Celestynów, Góra Kalwaria, Konstancin-Jeziorna, Sobienie-Jeziory and Wiązowna.
