= Niesadna-Przecinka =

- Village
- Location within Poland
- Coordinates: 51°59′09″N 21°34′24″E
- Country: Poland
- Voivodeship: Masovian
- County: Garwolin
- Gmina: Pilawa
- Population: 43

Niesadna-Przecinka [ɲɛˈsadna pʂɛˈt͡ɕiŋka] is a village in the administrative district of Gmina Pilawa, within Garwolin County, Masovian Voivodeship, in east-central Poland.
