= Sobienie Szlacheckie =

- Village
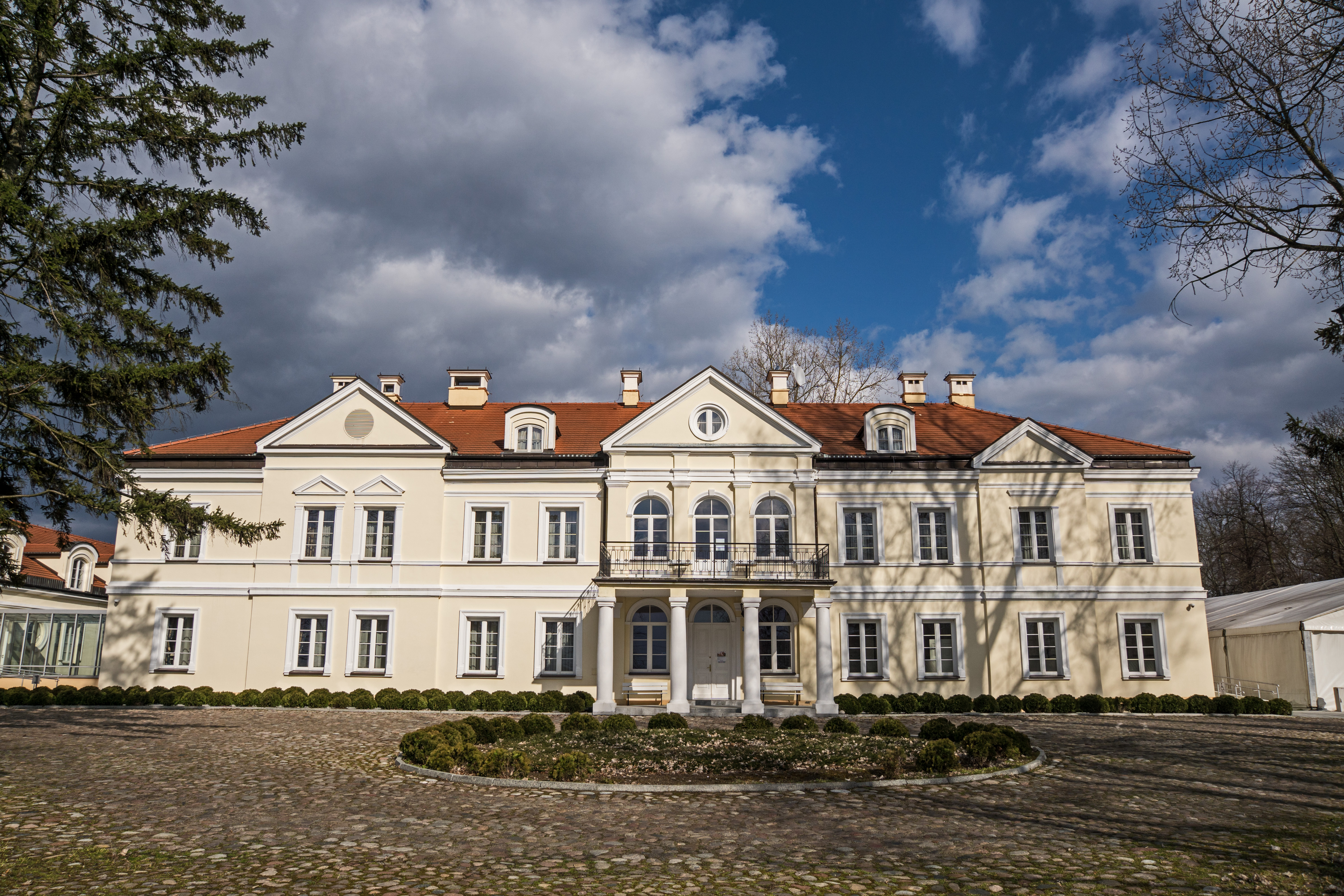
- Palace in Sobienie Szlacheckie

- Location within Poland
- Coordinates: 51°57′N 21°20′E
- Country: Poland
- Voivodeship: Masovian
- County: Otwock
- Gmina: Sobienie-Jeziory
- Population: near 300
- Time zone: UTC+1 (CET)
  - Summer (DST): UTC+2 (CEST)
- Vehicle registration: WOT

Sobienie Szlacheckie [sɔˈbjɛɲɛ ʂlaˈxɛt͡skʲɛ] is a village in Gmina Sobienie-Jeziory, Otwock County, in central Poland. The population is near 300.

== History ==
The "Szlacheckie" is a historical suffix, which means belonging to nobility (Polish: szlachta). There is a preserved historic palace and park ensemble in the village. In 1827, the village had a population of 239.

From 1975 to 1998 it was administratively located in Siedlce Voivodeship.

== Transport ==
The Voivodeship road 739 runs through the village.

=== Airport ===
There is an airport with ICAO code EPSJ in the village. It can host planes up to 5700 kg, including also ultra light.
