= Vigoda =

Vigoda is a surname. Notable people with the surname include:

- Abe Vigoda (1921–2016), American actor
- Val Vigoda, American electric violinist and singer-songwriter

== Fictional characters ==
- Eddie Vigoda, a fictional character from the 2009 film Nine Dead
- Sam Vigoda, a fictional character from the 1996 film Night Falls on Manhattan
