= Wygoda, Gmina Parchowo =

Settlement in Kashubia

Wygoda Wigòda
- Przysiółek
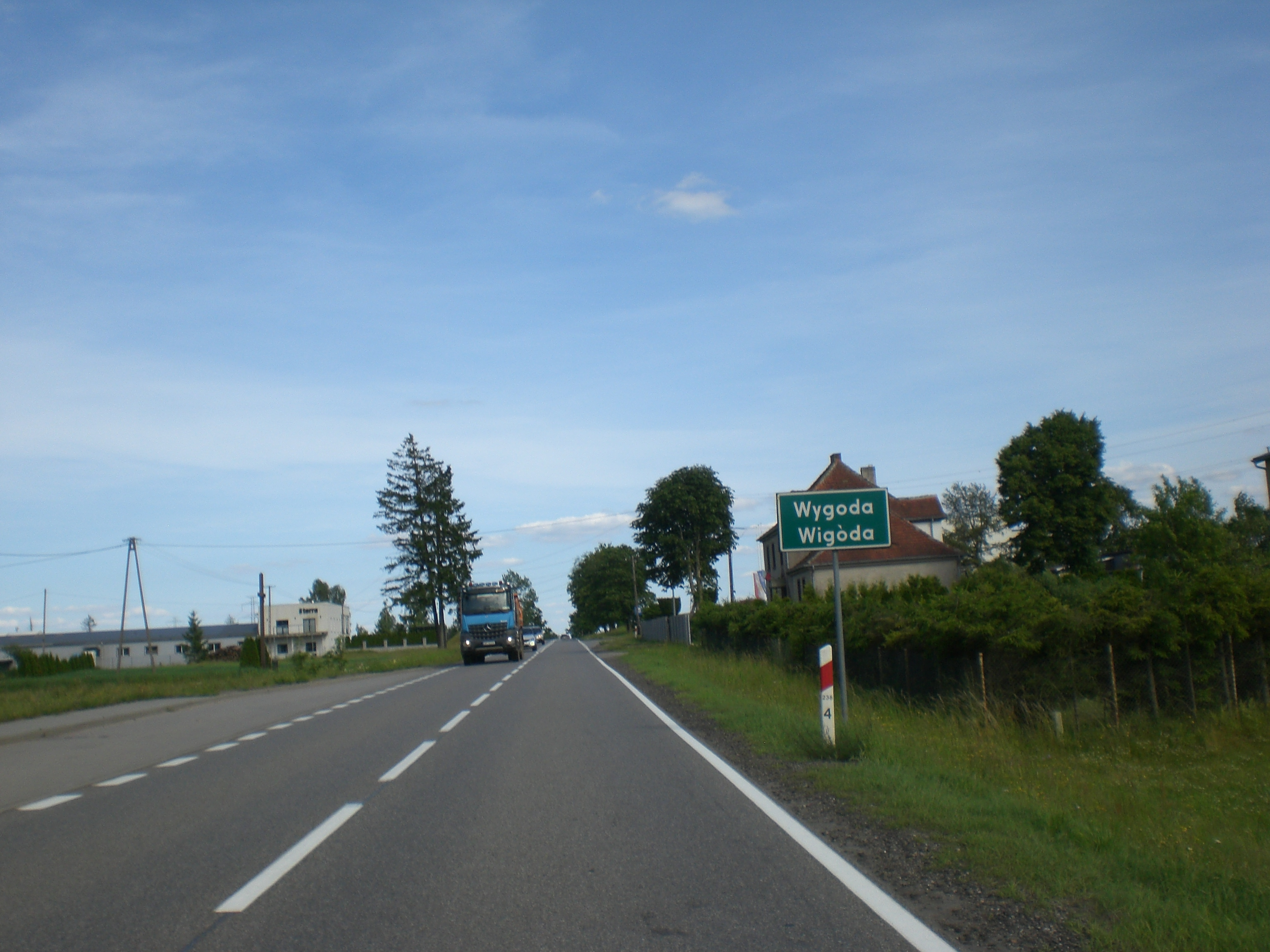

- Location within Poland
- Coordinates: 54°9′19″N 17°41′8″E
- Country: Poland
- Voivodeship: Pomeranian
- County: Bytów
- Gmina: Parchowo
- Population: 45

Wygoda [vɨˈɡɔda] (Kashubian: Wigòda) is a przysiółek in the administrative district of Gmina Parchowo, within Bytów County, Pomeranian Voivodeship, in northern Poland.

For details of the history of the region, see History of Pomerania.
