= Warszawice =

- Village
- Location within Poland
- Coordinates: 51°58′N 21°19′E
- Country: Poland
- Voivodeship: Masovian
- County: Otwock
- Gmina: Sobienie-Jeziory
- Elevation: 95 m (312 ft)
- Population: 330

Warszawice [varʂaˈvit͡sɛ] is a village in Gmina Sobienie-Jeziory, Otwock County, Masovian Voivodeship, Poland.
