= Łucznica =

- Village
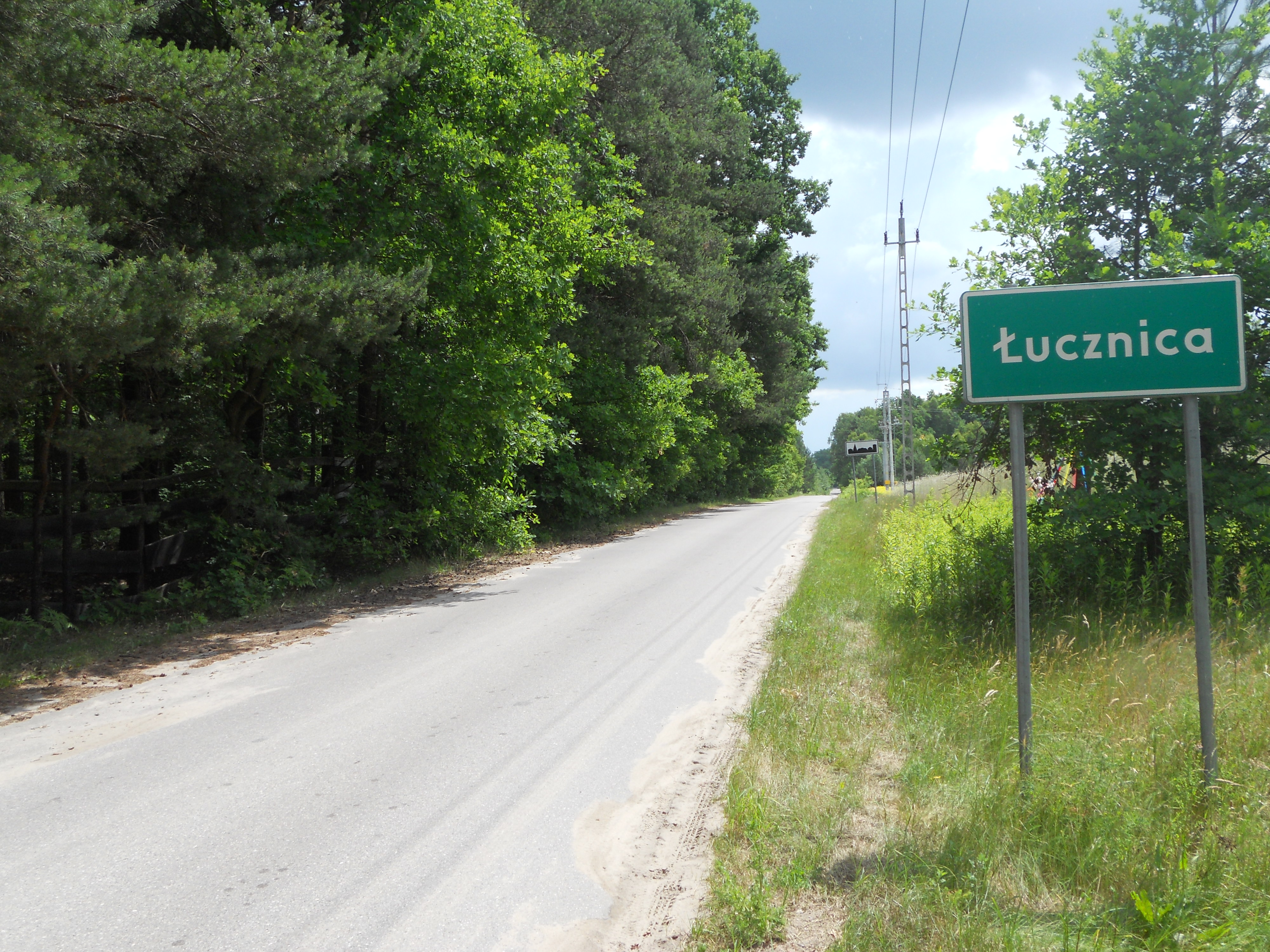
- Entering the village

- Location within Poland
- Coordinates: 51°56′32″N 21°29′6″E
- Country: Poland
- Voivodeship: Masovian
- County: Garwolin
- Gmina: Pilawa

Łucznica [wut͡ʂˈnit͡sa] is a village in the administrative district of Gmina Pilawa, within Garwolin County, Masovian Voivodeship, in east-central Poland.
