= Sobienie Kiełczewskie Pierwsze =

- Village
- Location within Poland
- Coordinates: 51°54′50″N 21°20′11″E
- Country: Poland
- Voivodeship: Masovian
- County: Otwock
- Gmina: Sobienie-Jeziory

Sobienie Kiełczewskie Pierwsze [sɔˈbjɛɲɛ kʲɛu̯ˈt͡ʂɛfskʲɛ ˈpjɛrfʂɛ] is a village in Otwock County, Gmina Sobienie-Jeziory. The population is near 200. In the village is Voivodship Road 801.

From 1975 to 1998 this village was in Siedlce Voivodeship.
