= Wygoda, Gmina Lipnica =

Settlement in Poland

Wygoda
- Colony
- Location within Poland
- Coordinates: 53°59′5″N 17°23′16″E
- Country: Poland
- Voivodeship: Pomeranian
- County: Bytów
- Gmina: Lipnica
- Population: 17

Wygoda [vɨˈɡɔda] is a colony in the administrative district of Gmina Lipnica, within Bytów County, Pomeranian Voivodeship, in northern Poland.

For details of the history of the region, see History of Pomerania.
