= Wygoda, Starogard County =

Settlement in Pomeranian Voivodeship, Poland

Wygoda
- Hamlet
- Location within Poland
- Coordinates: 53°54′13″N 18°28′29″E
- Country: Poland
- Voivodeship: Pomeranian
- County: Starogard
- Gmina: Starogard Gdański
- Time zone: UTC+1 (CET)
  - Summer (DST): UTC+2 (CEST)
- SIMC: 0173605
- Vehicle registration: GST

Wygoda is a hamlet in the administrative district of Gmina Starogard Gdański, within Starogard County, Pomeranian Voivodeship, in northern Poland. The settlement lies within the ethnocultural region of Kociewie in the historic region of Pomerania.
