= Jaźwiny, Gmina Pilawa =

Jaźwiny
- Village
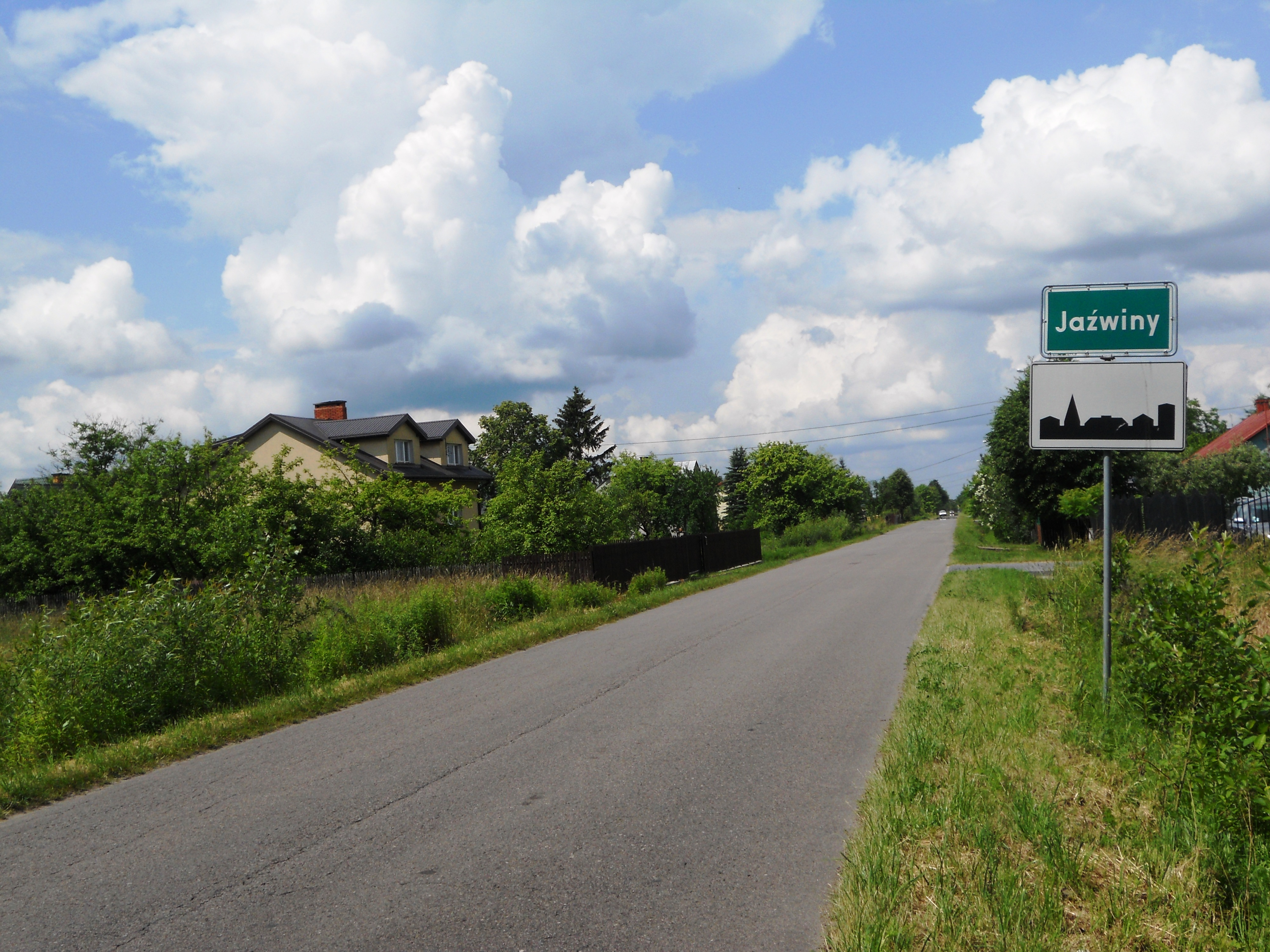
- Street and road sign of Jaźwiny, Gmina Pilawa

- Location within Poland
- Coordinates: 51°58′38″N 21°24′43″E
- Country: Poland
- Voivodeship: Masovian
- County: Garwolin
- Gmina: Pilawa

Jaźwiny [jaʑˈvinɨ] is a village in the administrative district of Gmina Pilawa, within Garwolin County, Masovian Voivodeship, in east-central Poland.
