= Sobienie-Jeziory =

- Village
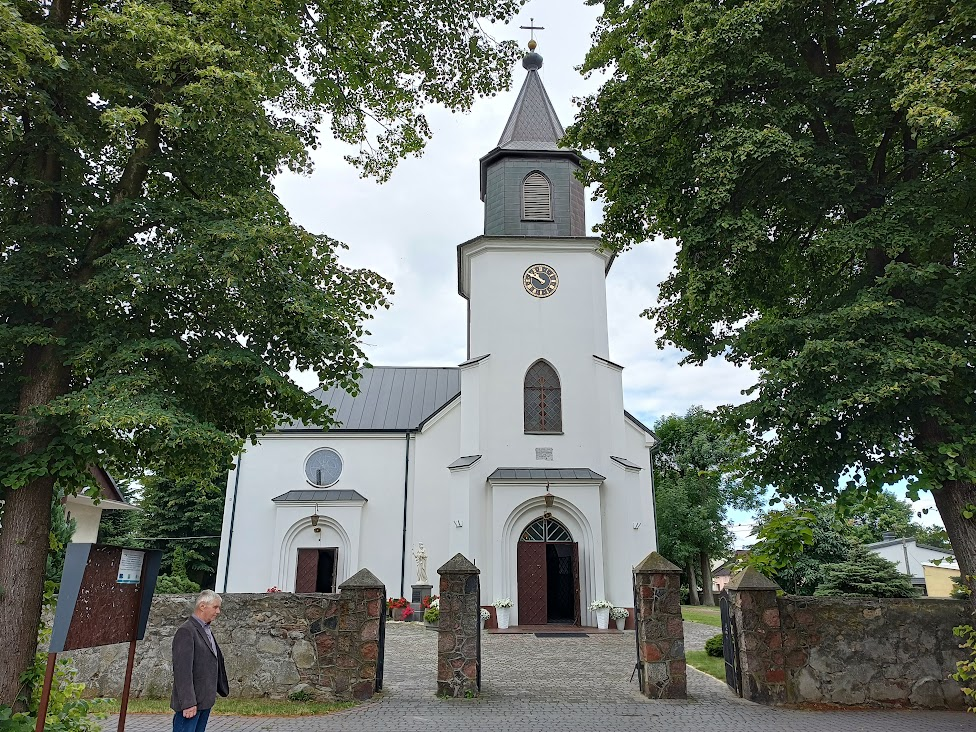
- All Saints church in Sobienie-Jeziory

- Location within Poland
- Coordinates: 51°56′N 21°19′E
- Country: Poland
- Voivodeship: Masovian
- County: Otwock
- Gmina: Sobienie-Jeziory
- Population: 700
- Time zone: UTC+1 (CET)
  - Summer (DST): UTC+2 (CEST)
- Vehicle registration: WOT

Sobienie-Jeziory [sɔˈbjɛɲɛ jɛˈʑɔrɨ] is a village in Otwock County, Poland. It is the capital of a Gmina Sobienie-Jeziory (commune).

In the 18th century, Jacek Jezierski established Poland's first scythe factory in the village.

From 1975 to 1998 it was administratively located in Siedlce Voivodeship.
