= Wygoda, Garwolin County =

Wygoda
- Village
- Location within Poland
- Coordinates: 51°58′N 21°36′E
- Country: Poland
- Voivodeship: Masovian
- County: Garwolin
- Gmina: Pilawa
- Population (approx.): 500

Wygoda [vɨˈɡɔda] is a village in the administrative district of Gmina Pilawa, within Garwolin County, Masovian Voivodeship, in east-central Poland.
