= Dziecinów, Otwock County =

Dziecinów
- Village
- Location within Poland
- Coordinates: 51°59′00″N 21°17′00″E
- Country: Poland
- Voivodeship: Masovian
- County: Otwock
- Gmina: Sobienie-Jeziory
- Elevation: 94 m (308 ft)
- Population: 704
- Website: www.dziecinow.pl

Dziecinów (Polish: [d͡ʑɛˈt͡ɕinuf]) is a village in Otwock County, Gmina Sobienie-Jeziory. The village covers an area of 6 km^{2} (2.3 sq mi). It has approximately 704 inhabitants (2007). In the village is Voivodship Road 801, Voivodship Road 799 and Voivodship Road 805 and the sports club Wisła Dziecinów. It lies near the Vistula river. From 1975 to 1998 the village was in Siedlce Voivodeship.
