= Sobienie Biskupie =

- Village
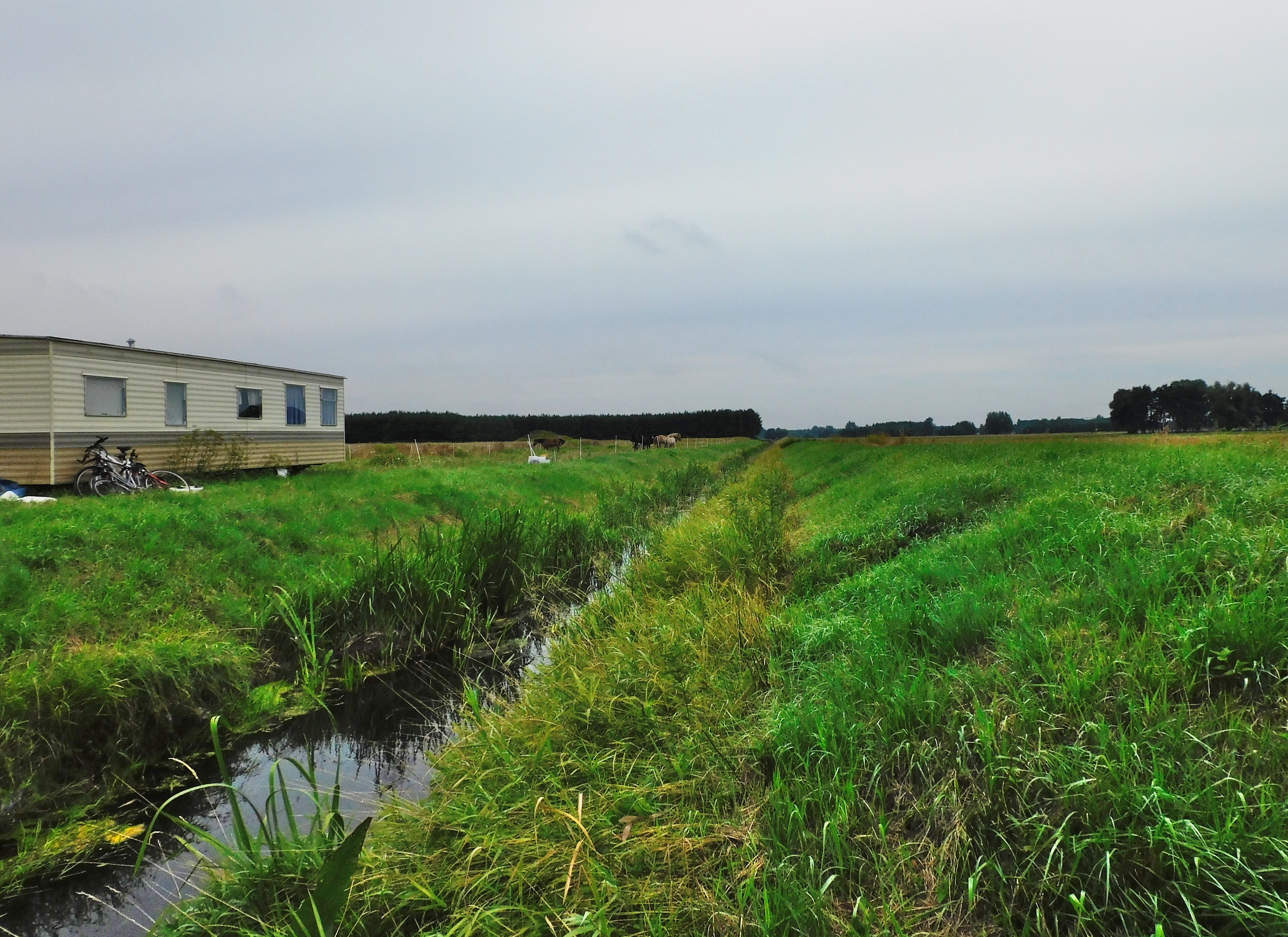

- Location within Poland
- Coordinates: 51°58′N 21°20′E
- Country: Poland
- Voivodeship: Masovian
- County: Otwock
- Gmina: Sobienie-Jeziory
- Population: 420
- Time zone: UTC+1 (CET)
  - Summer (DST): UTC+2 (CEST)
- Vehicle registration: WOT

Sobienie Biskupie [sɔˈbjɛɲɛ bisˈkupjɛ] is a village in Gmina Sobienie-Jeziory, Otwock County, in central Poland. The population is near 420.

== History ==
The territory became a part of the emerging Polish state under its first historic ruler Mieszko I in the 10th century. In the Middle Ages, Sobienie was granted to Bishops of Poznań. It was mentioned as a possession of the bishops in the confirmation of old privileges by Duke Bolesław II of Masovia in 1297, and Duke Siemowit III in 1351.

In 1827, the village had a population of 320.

From 1975 to 1998, it was administratively located in Siedlce Voivodeship.
