= Siedlce Voivodeship =

Former administrative division of Poland

Coordinates: 52°09′58″N 22°16′57″E

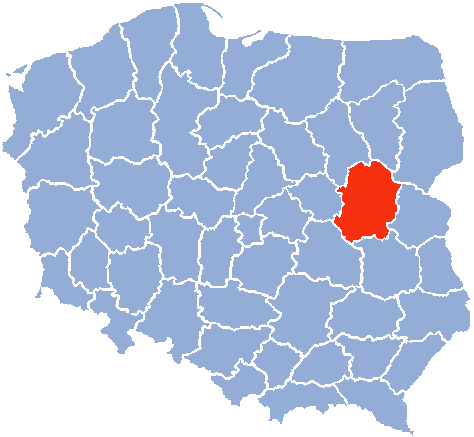
Siedlce Voivodeship

Siedlce Voivodeship (Polish: województwo siedleckie) was a unit of administrative division and local government in Poland in the years 1975–1998, superseded by Masovian Voivodeship and Lublin Voivodeship. Its capital city was Siedlce.

In 1998, the year it was dissolved, it had an area of 8,499 km^2.

== Major cities and towns (population in 1995) ==
- Siedlce (74,100)
- Mińsk Mazowiecki (35,000)
- Łuków (32,000)

== See also ==
- Voivodeships of Poland
