= Otwock County =

Otwock County Powiat otwocki
- County
- Flag Coat of arms

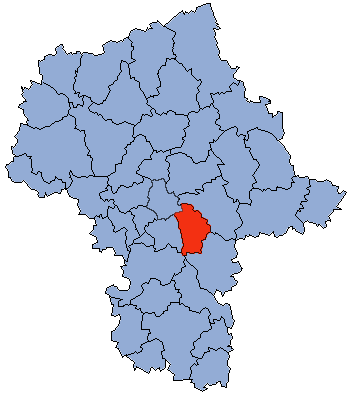
- Location within the voivodeship

- Division into gminas
- Coordinates (Otwock): 52°7′N 21°16′E
- Country: Poland
- Voivodeship: Masovian
- Seat: Otwock
- Gminas: Total 8 (incl. 2 urban): Józefów; Otwock; Gmina Celestynów; Gmina Karczew; Gmina Kołbiel; Gmina Osieck; Gmina Sobienie-Jeziory; Gmina Wiązowna

Area
  - Total: 615.09 km^{2} (237.49 sq mi)

Population (2019)
  - Total: 124,241
  - Density: 201.99/km^{2} (523.15/sq mi)
  - Urban: 75,381
  - Rural: 48,860
- Car plates: WOT
- Website: www.powiat-otwocki.pl

Otwock County (Polish: powiat otwocki) is a unit of territorial administration and local government (powiat) in Masovian Voivodeship, east-central Poland. It came into being on January 1, 1999, as a result of the Polish local government reforms passed in 1998. Its administrative seat and largest town is Otwock, which lies 22 kilometres (14 mi) south-east of Warsaw. The county also contains the towns of Józefów, lying 3 km (2 mi) north-west of Otwock, and Karczew, 4 km (2 mi) south of Otwock.

The county covers an area of 615.09 square kilometres (237.5 sq mi). As of 2019 its total population is 124,241, out of which the population of Otwock is 44,827, that of Józefów is 20,698, that of Karczew is 9,856, and the rural population is 48,860.

== Neighbouring counties ==
Otwock County is bordered by Mińsk County to the east, Garwolin County to the south-east, Grójec County to the south-west, and Piaseczno County and the city of Warsaw to the west.

== Administrative divisions ==
The county is subdivided into eight gminas (two urban, one urban-rural and five rural). These are listed in the following table, in descending order of population.

Gmina	Type	Area (km^{2})	Population (2019)	Seat
Otwock	urban	47.3	44,827	
Józefów	urban	23.9	20,698	
Gmina Karczew	urban-rural	81.5	15,830	Karczew
Gmina Wiązowna	rural	102.1	12,971	Wiązowna
Gmina Celestynów	rural	88.9	11,713	Celestynów
Gmina Kołbiel	rural	106.4	8,199	Kołbiel
Gmina Sobienie-Jeziory	rural	97.4	6,384	Sobienie-Jeziory
Gmina Osieck	rural	67.5	3,619	Osieck

== See also ==
- Świdermajer, the characteristic style of architecture in the area
