= Voivodeship road 797 =

Road in Mazovia, Poland

Coordinates: 51°13′46.83″N 21°0′44.02″E

Voivodeship Road 797
- Droga wojewódzka nr 797

Route information
- Maintained by Mazowiecki Zarząd Dróg Wojewódzkich
- Length: 2 km (1.2 mi)

Major junctions
- From: Celestynów
- To: Regut

Location
- Country: Poland
- Regions: Masovian Voivodeship

Highway system
- National roads in Poland; Voivodeship roads
← DW 796	→ DW 798

Voivodeship road 797 (Polish: Droga wojewódzka nr 797, abbreviated DW 797) is a route in the Polish voivodeship roads network. It runs through the Masovian Voivodeship (Otwock County), leading from Celestynów to Regut where it meets national road 50, a Warsaw transit bypass.

== Cities and towns along the route ==
- Celestynów
- Regut

== Route plan ==
km	Icon	Name	Crossed roads
		National road 50 in direction to: Góra Kalwaria; Grójec; Sochaczew; Płońsk; Ciechanów	
		National road 50 in direction to: Kołbiel; Mińsk Mazowiecki; Łochów; Ostrów Mazowiecka	
0		Regut	National road 50 (Poland)
2		Celestynów	św. Kazimierza Street
