= Zabieżki railway station =

Railway station in Zabieżki, Poland

Zabieżki
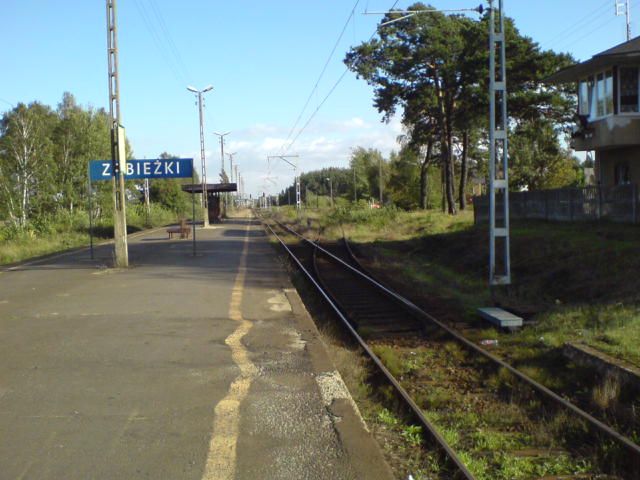

General information
- Location: Zabieżki, Celestynów, Otwock, Masovian; Poland
- Coordinates: 52.0096642°N 21.4783336°E
- System: Rail Station
- Owner: Polskie Koleje Państwowe S.A.

Services
| Preceding station | Masovian Railways | Following station |
|---|---|---|
| Chrosna towards Warszawa Zachodnia | R7 | Augustówka towards Dęblin |
Location

Zabieżki railway station is a railway station at Zabieżki, Otwock, Masovian, Poland. It is served by Masovian Railways.
