= Kołbiel railway station =

Railway station in Masovia, Poland

Kołbiel
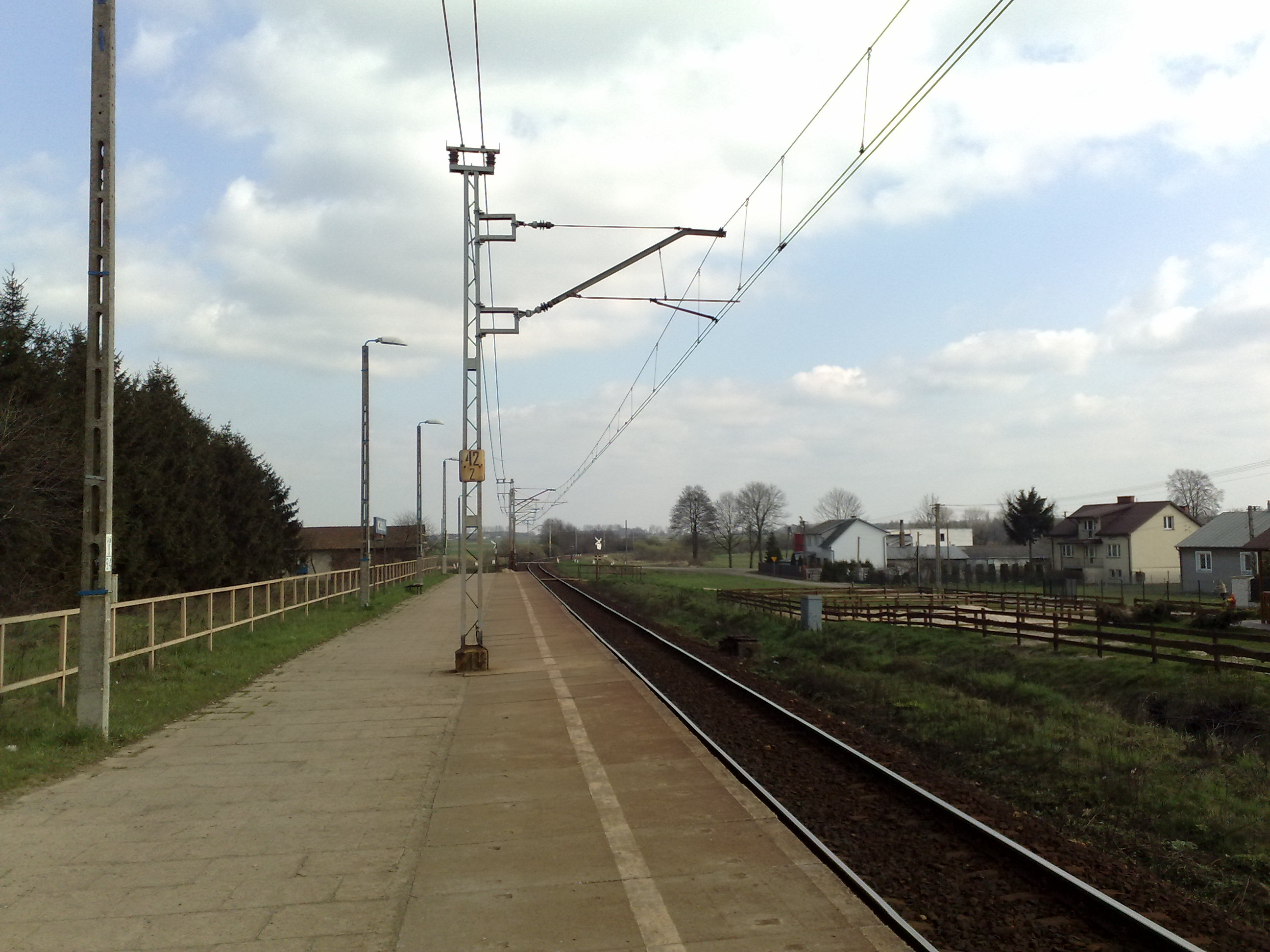

General information
- Location: Karpiska, Kołbiel, Otwock, Masovian; Poland
- Coordinates: 52.0404526°N 21.4339162°E
- System: Rail Station
- Owner: Polskie Koleje Państwowe S.A.

Services
Preceding station	Masovian Railways	Following station
Celestynów towards Warszawa Zachodnia	R7	Chrosna towards Dęblin
Location

Kołbiel railway station is a railway station at Karpiska, Otwock, Masovian, Poland. It is served by Masovian Railways.
