= Pogorzel Warszawska railway station =

Railway station in Gmina Celestynów, Poland

Pogorzel Warszawska
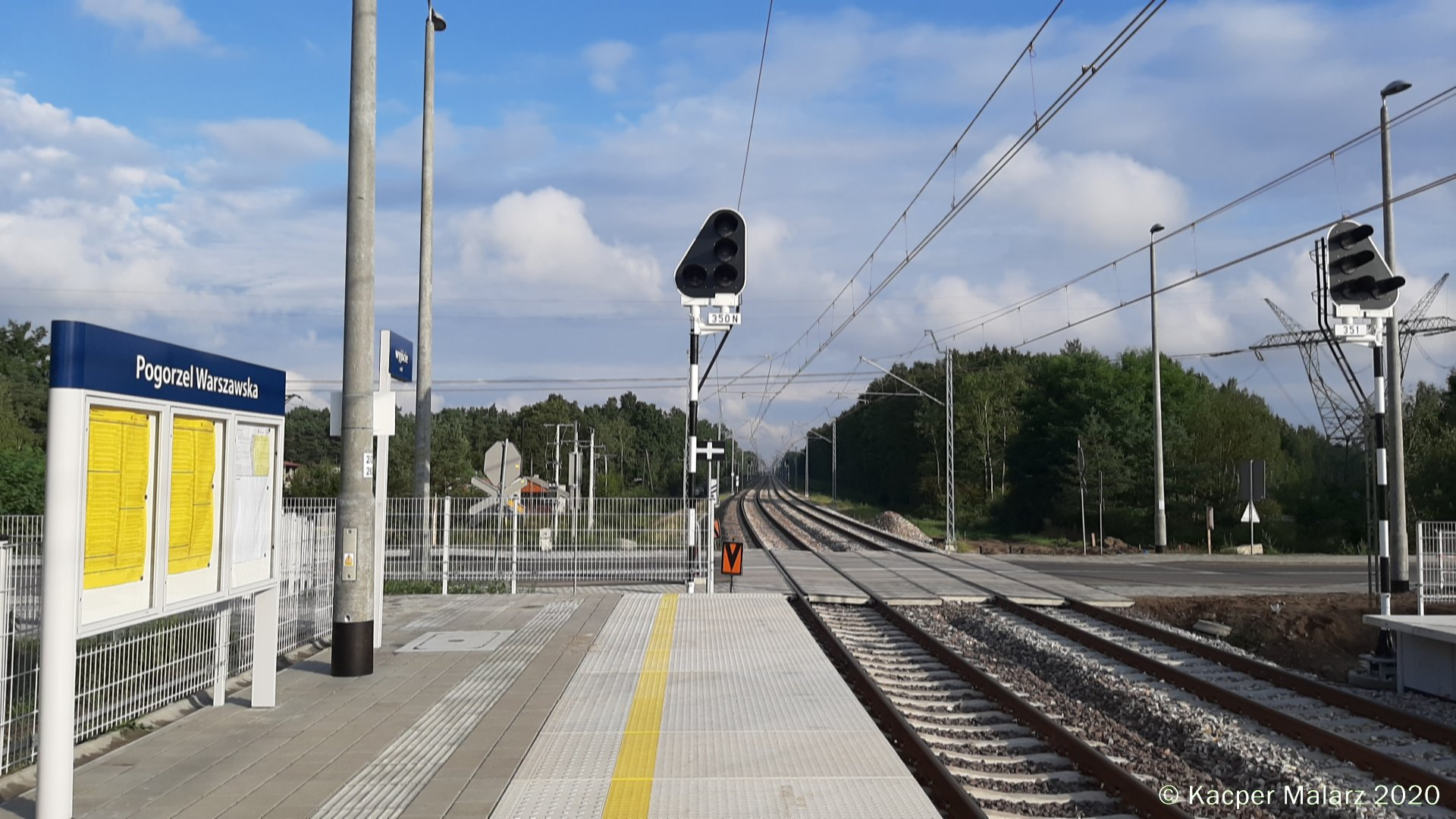

General information
- Location: Pogorzel, Celestynów, Otwock, Masovian; Poland
- Coordinates: 52.0973254°N 21.3350335°E
- System: Rail Station
- Owner: Polskie Koleje Państwowe S.A.

Services
Preceding station	Masovian Railways	Following station
Śródborów towards Warszawa Zachodnia	R7	Stara Wieś towards Dęblin
Location

Pogorzel Warszawska railway station is a railway station at Pogorzel, Otwock, Masovian, Poland. It is served by Masovian Railways.
