= Celestynów railway station =

Railway station in Celestynów, Poland

Celestynów
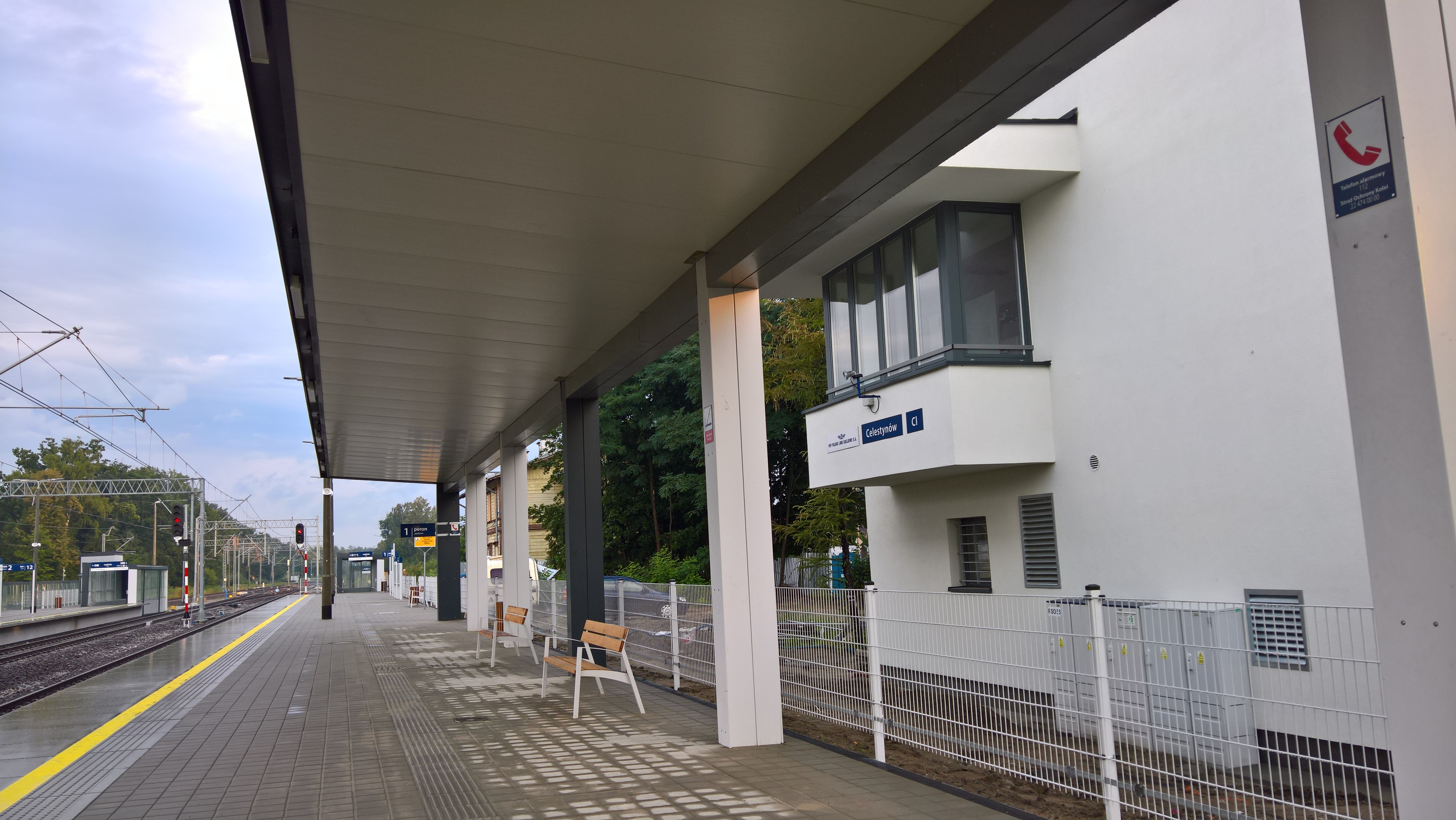

General information
- Location: Celestynów, Celestynów, Otwock, Masovian; Poland
- Coordinates: 52.0586442°N 21.3925726°E
- System: Rail Station
- Owner: Polskie Koleje Państwowe S.A.

Services
Preceding station	Masovian Railways	Following station
Stara Wieś towards Warszawa Zachodnia	R7	Kołbiel towards Dęblin
Location

Celestynów railway station is a railway station at Celestynów, Otwock, Masovian, Poland. It is served by Masovian Railways.
