= Stara Wieś railway station =

Railway station in Stara Wieś, Poland

Stara Wieś
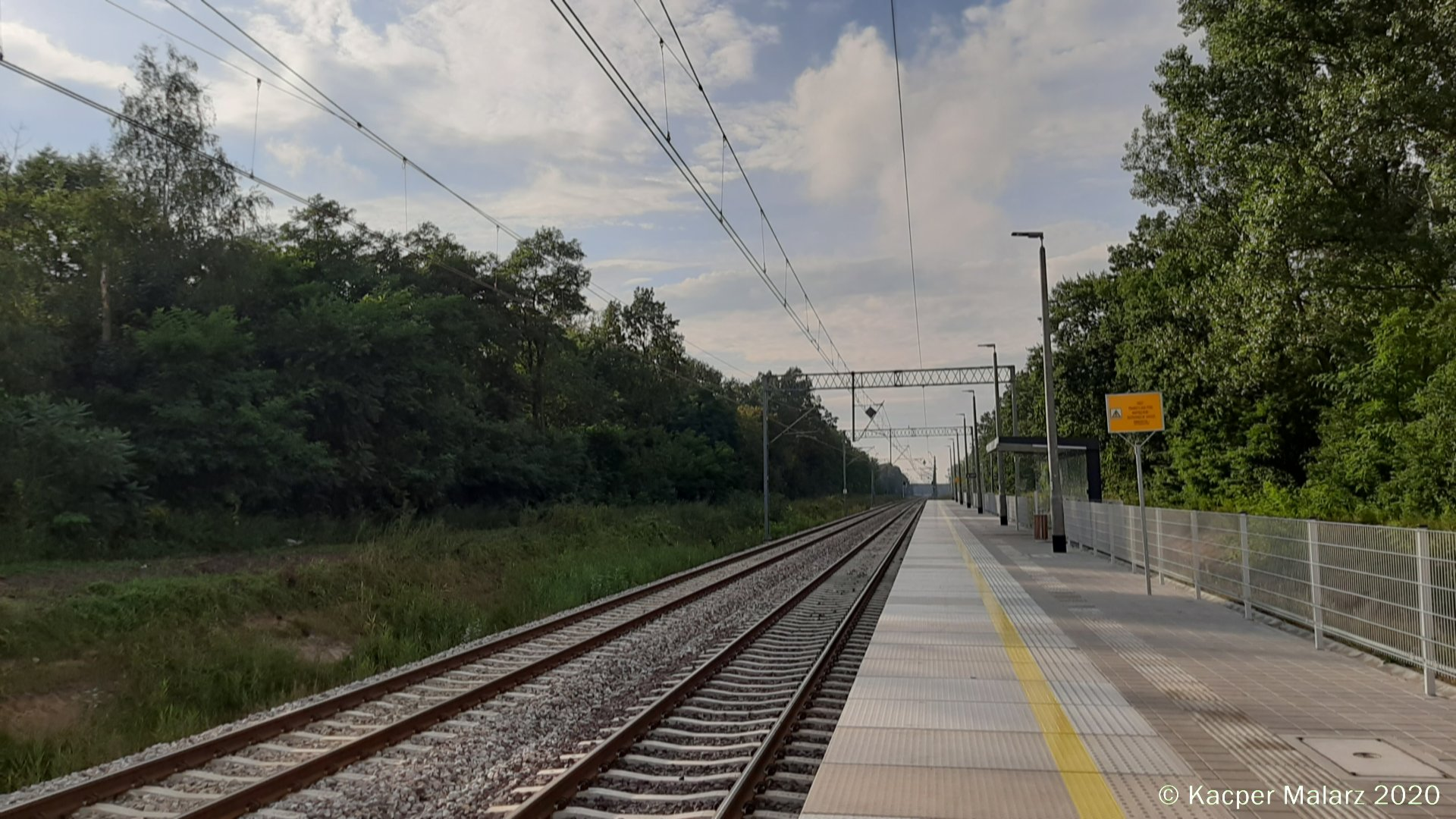

General information
- Location: Stara Wieś, Celestynów, Otwock, Masovian; Poland
- Coordinates: 52.0825507°N 21.3621215°E
- System: Rail Station
- Owner: Polskie Koleje Państwowe S.A.

Services
Preceding station	Masovian Railways	Following station
Pogorzel Warszawska towards Warszawa Zachodnia	R7	Celestynów towards Dęblin
Location

Stara Wieś railway station is a railway station at Stara Wieś, Otwock, Masovian, Poland. It is served by Masovian Railways.
