= Bocian =

Bocian is a Polish word for stork. It may also refer to:

- Bocian, Masovian Voivodeship, a village in Poland
- Bocian (surname)
- PZL Bielsko SZD-9, Polish-made performance/training glider
