= Augustówka railway station =

Railway station in Masovian Voivodeship, Poland

Augustówka
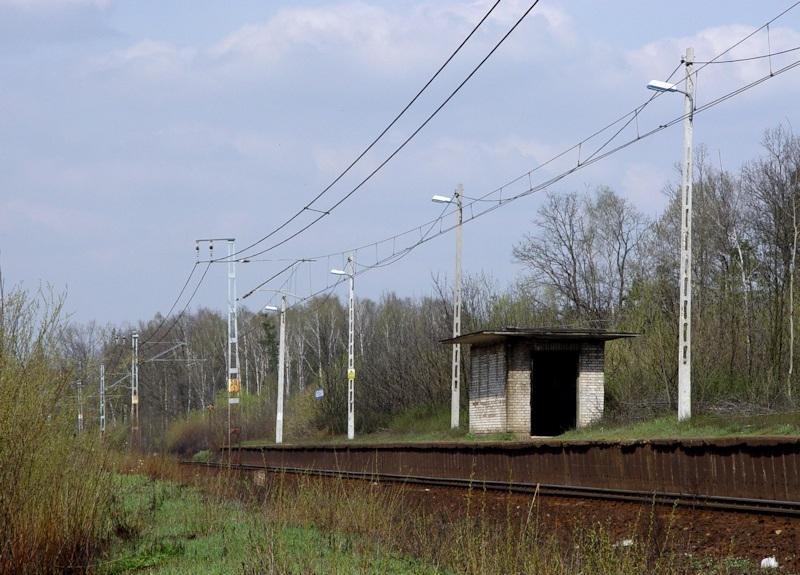

General information
- Location: Augustówka, Masovian Voivodeship; Poland
- Coordinates: 51.9873612°N 21.5140702°E
- Owner: Polish State Railways

Services
Preceding station	Masovian Railways	Following station
Zabieżki towards Warszawa Zachodnia	R7	Pilawa towards Dęblin
Location

Augustówka is a railway station in Augustówka, Otwock County, Masovian Voivodeship, in central Poland. It is served by Masovian Railways.
