= Siwianka, Masovian Voivodeship =

Siwianka
- Village
- Location within Poland
- Coordinates: 52°6′N 21°26′E
- Country: Poland
- Voivodeship: Masovian
- County: Otwock
- Gmina: Kołbiel
- Population: 160
- Website: https://siwianka.pl.tl

Siwianka [ɕiˈvjaŋka] is a village in the administrative district of Gmina Kołbiel, within Otwock County, Masovian Voivodeship, in east-central Poland. It is approximately 6 km (4 mi) north-west of Kołbiel, 12 km (7 mi) east of Otwock, and 33 km (21 mi) south-east of Warsaw.
