= Oleksin =

Oleksin may refer to the following places:

- Oleksin, Otwock County in Masovian Voivodeship (east-central Poland)
- Oleksin, Siedlce County in Masovian Voivodeship (east-central Poland)
- Oleksin, Podlaskie Voivodeship (north-east Poland)
