= A50 autostrada (Poland) =

Planned motorway in Poland

Autostrada A50

Route information
- Length: 100 km (62 mi) approx, planned

Major junctions
- From: A 2 near Solidarity Transport Hub

- S 8 near Mszczonów; S 7 near Grójec; S 17 near Kołbiel

- To: A 2 near Mińsk Mazowiecki

Location
- Country: Poland
- Major cities: Warsaw

Highway system
- National roads in Poland; Voivodeship roads
← A 18	→ A 1

The autostrada A50 is a planned motorway in Poland, in Masovian Voivodeship. It will run as a circular road south of the Warsaw metropolitan area to take over the transit traffic from the existing expressway ring around the city, mainly from the S2 expressway. Once built, the motorway bypass will also be one of the road connectors to the planned Solidarity Transport Hub. It was added to the motorway and expressway index by Polish government on 24 September 2019.

== See also ==
- National road 50 (Poland)
