= Chrosna railway station =

Railway station in Masovian Voivodeship, Poland

Chrosna
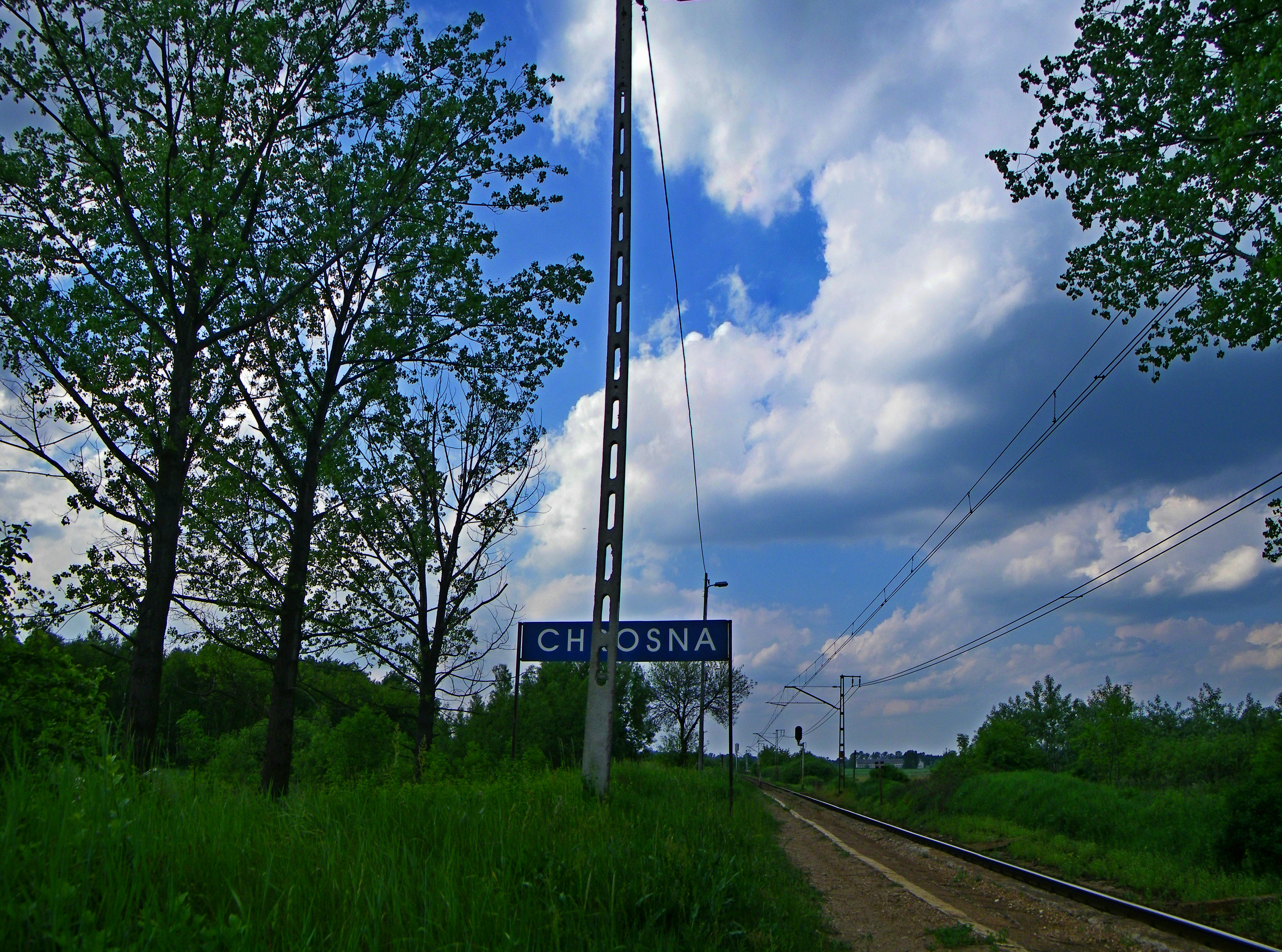

General information
- Location: Chrosna, Celestynów, Otwock, Masovian; Poland
- Coordinates: 52.0340829°N 21.4464609°E
- System: Rail Station
- Owner: Polskie Koleje Państwowe S.A.

Services
Preceding station	Masovian Railways	Following station
Kołbiel towards Warszawa Zachodnia	R7	Zabieżki towards Dęblin
Location

Chrosna railway station is a railway station at Chrosna, Otwock, Masovian, Poland. It is served by Masovian Railways.
