= Glina, Otwock County =

Glina
- Village
- Location within Poland
- Coordinates: 52°6′N 21°21′E
- Country: Poland
- Voivodeship: Masovian
- County: Otwock
- Gmina: Celestynów

Glina [ˈɡlina] is a village in the administrative district of Gmina Celestynów, within Otwock County, Masovian Voivodeship, in east-central Poland.
