= Ostrów, Otwock County =

Ostrów
- Village
- Location within Poland
- Coordinates: 52°6′19″N 21°23′41″E
- Country: Poland
- Voivodeship: Masovian
- County: Otwock
- Gmina: Celestynów
- Time zone: UTC+1 (CET)
  - Summer (DST): UTC+2 (CEST)

Ostrów [ˈɔstruf] is a village in the administrative district of Gmina Celestynów, within Otwock County, Masovian Voivodeship, in east-central Poland.

Five Polish citizens were murdered by Nazi Germany in the village during World War II.
