= Tabor, Masovian Voivodeship =

Tabor
- Village
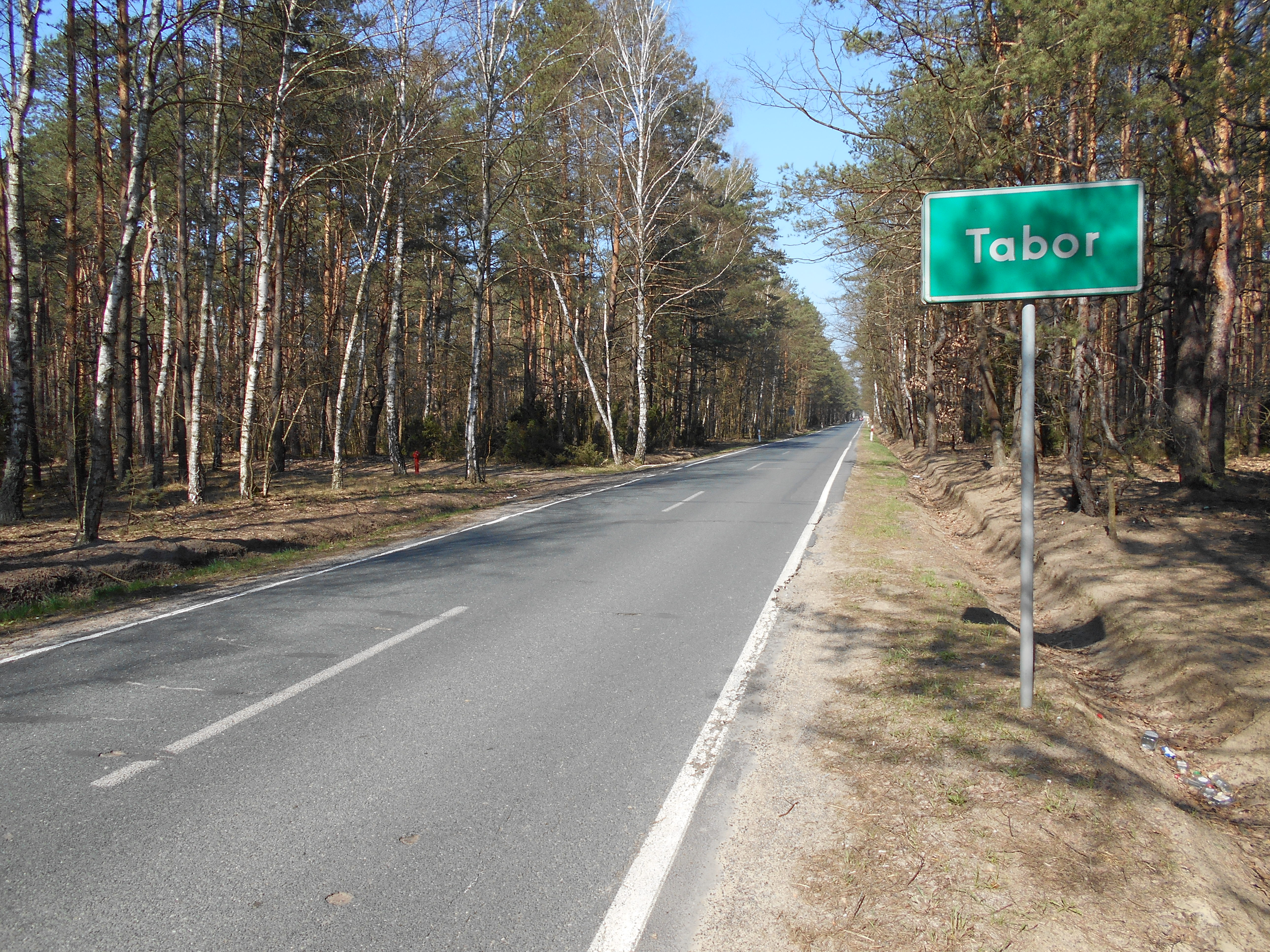

- Location within Poland
- Coordinates: 52°02′05″N 21°21′05″E
- Country: Poland
- Voivodeship: Masovian
- County: Otwock
- Gmina: Celestynów

Tabor [ˈtabɔr] is a village in the administrative district of Gmina Celestynów, within Otwock County, Masovian Voivodeship, in east-central Poland.
