= Podbiel, Masovian Voivodeship =

Podbiel
- Village
- Location within Poland
- Coordinates: 52°2′N 21°22′E
- Country: Poland
- Voivodeship: Masovian
- County: Otwock
- Gmina: Celestynów

Podbiel [ˈpɔdbjɛl] is a village in the administrative district of Gmina Celestynów, within Otwock County, Masovian Voivodeship, in east-central Poland.

Near village, on marshes "Bagno Całowanie" was discovered relics of neolithic settlement (11 800 – 8500 years BP).
