= Zabieżki =

- Village
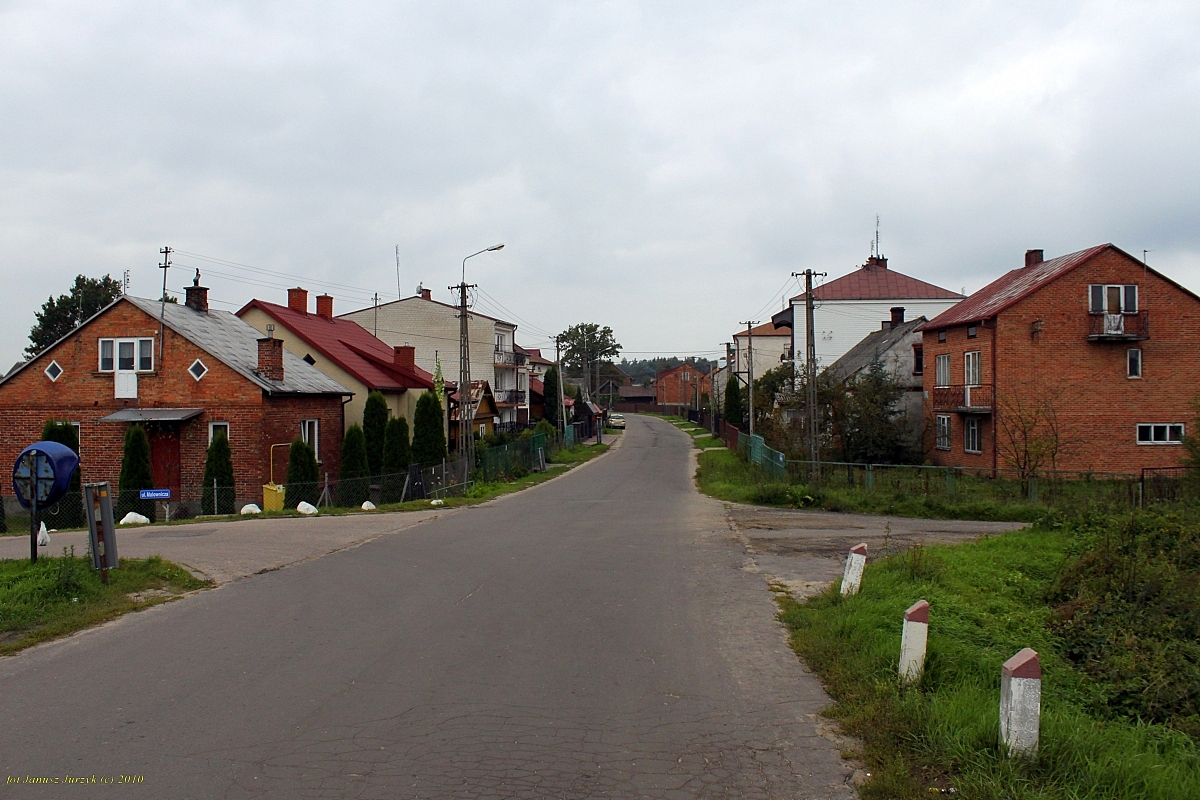

- Location within Poland
- Coordinates: 52°1′N 21°29′E
- Country: Poland
- Voivodeship: Masovian
- County: Otwock
- Gmina: Celestynów

Population (approx.)
  - Total: 800
- Time zone: UTC+1 (CET)
  - Summer (DST): UTC+2 (CEST)
- Vehicle registration: WOT

Zabieżki [zaˈbjɛʂki] is a village in the administrative district of Gmina Celestynów, within Otwock County, Masovian Voivodeship, in east-central Poland. It lies approximately 8 km (5 mi) south-east of Celestynów, 19 km (12 mi) south-east of Otwock, and 40 km (25 mi) south-east of Warsaw

== History ==
Five Polish citizens were murdered by Nazi Germany in the village during World War II.

From 1 June 1975 to 31 December 1998, the village of Zabieżki was an exclave of the Warsaw Voivodeship, surrounded by the Siedlce Voivodeship.
