= Stara Wieś Druga, Masovian Voivodeship =

Stara Wieś Druga
- Village
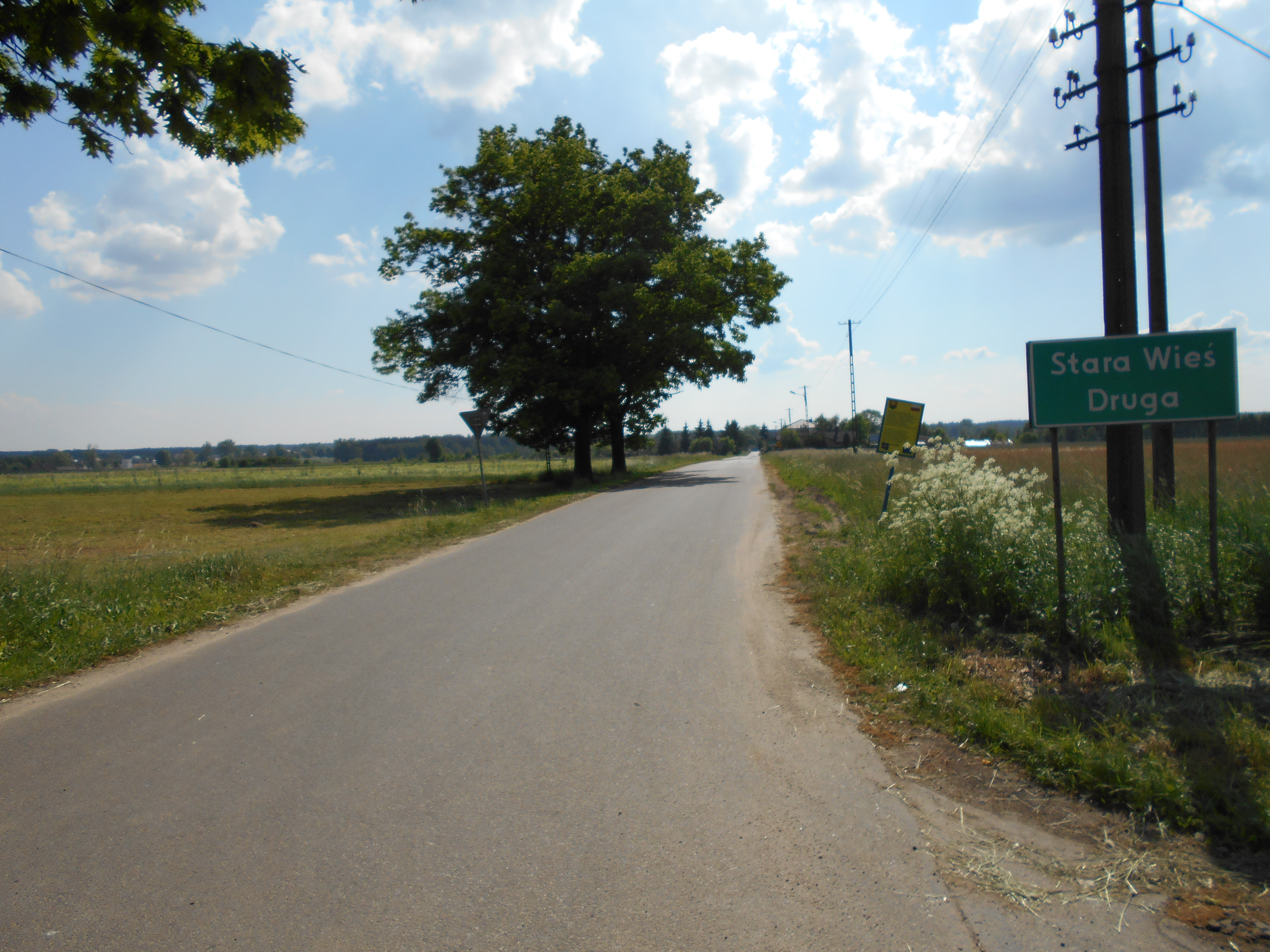

- Location within Poland
- Coordinates: 52°03′36″N 21°27′05″E
- Country: Poland
- Voivodeship: Masovian
- County: Otwock
- Gmina: Kołbiel

Stara Wieś Druga [ˈstara ˈvjɛɕ ˈdruɡa] is a village in the administrative district of Gmina Kołbiel, within Otwock County, Masovian Voivodeship, in east-central Poland.
