= Skorupy, Masovian Voivodeship =

Skorupy
- Village
- Location within Poland
- Coordinates: 52°3′N 21°26′E
- Country: Poland
- Voivodeship: Masovian
- County: Otwock
- Gmina: Kołbiel

Skorupy [skɔˈrupɨ] is a village in the administrative district of Gmina Kołbiel, within Otwock County, Masovian Voivodeship, in east-central Poland.
