= Podgórzno =

- Village
- Location within Poland
- Coordinates: 52°4′N 21°33′E
- Country: Poland
- Voivodeship: Masovian
- County: Otwock
- Gmina: Kołbiel

Podgórzno [pɔdˈɡuʐnɔ] is a village in the administrative district of Gmina Kołbiel, within Otwock County, Masovian Voivodeship, in east-central Poland.
