= Chrząszczówka =

- Village
- Location within Poland
- Coordinates: 52°1′N 21°28′E
- Country: Poland
- Voivodeship: Masovian
- County: Otwock
- Gmina: Kołbiel
- Population: 120

Chrząszczówka [xʂɔ̃ʂˈt͡ʂufka] is a village in the administrative district of Gmina Kołbiel, within Otwock County, Masovian Voivodeship, in east-central Poland.
