= Nowa Wieś, Otwock County =

Nowa Wieś
- Village
- Location within Poland
- Coordinates: 52°4′9″N 21°27′18″E
- Country: Poland
- Voivodeship: Masovian
- County: Otwock
- Gmina: Kołbiel

Nowa Wieś [ˈnɔva ˈvjɛɕ] is a village in the administrative district of Gmina Kołbiel, within Otwock County, Masovian Voivodeship, in east-central Poland.
