= Dobrzyniec =

- Village
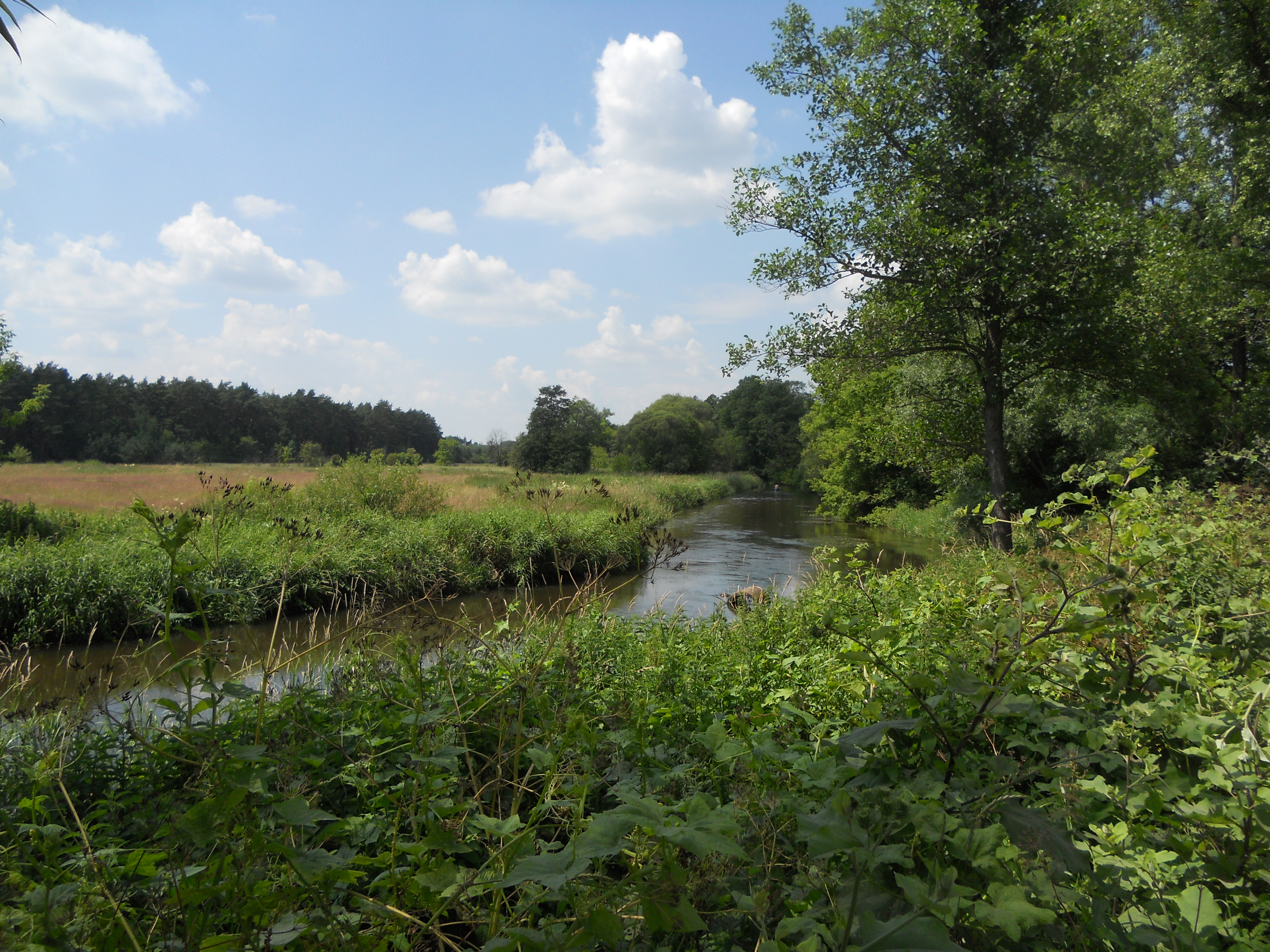
- Świder in Dobrzyniec

- Location within Poland
- Coordinates: 52°6′48″N 21°27′34″E
- Country: Poland
- Voivodeship: Masovian
- County: Otwock
- Gmina: Kołbiel

Dobrzyniec [dɔˈbʐɨɲɛt͡s] is a village in the administrative district of Gmina Kołbiel, within Otwock County, Masovian Voivodeship, in east-central Poland.
