= Kąty, Otwock County =

Kąty
- Village
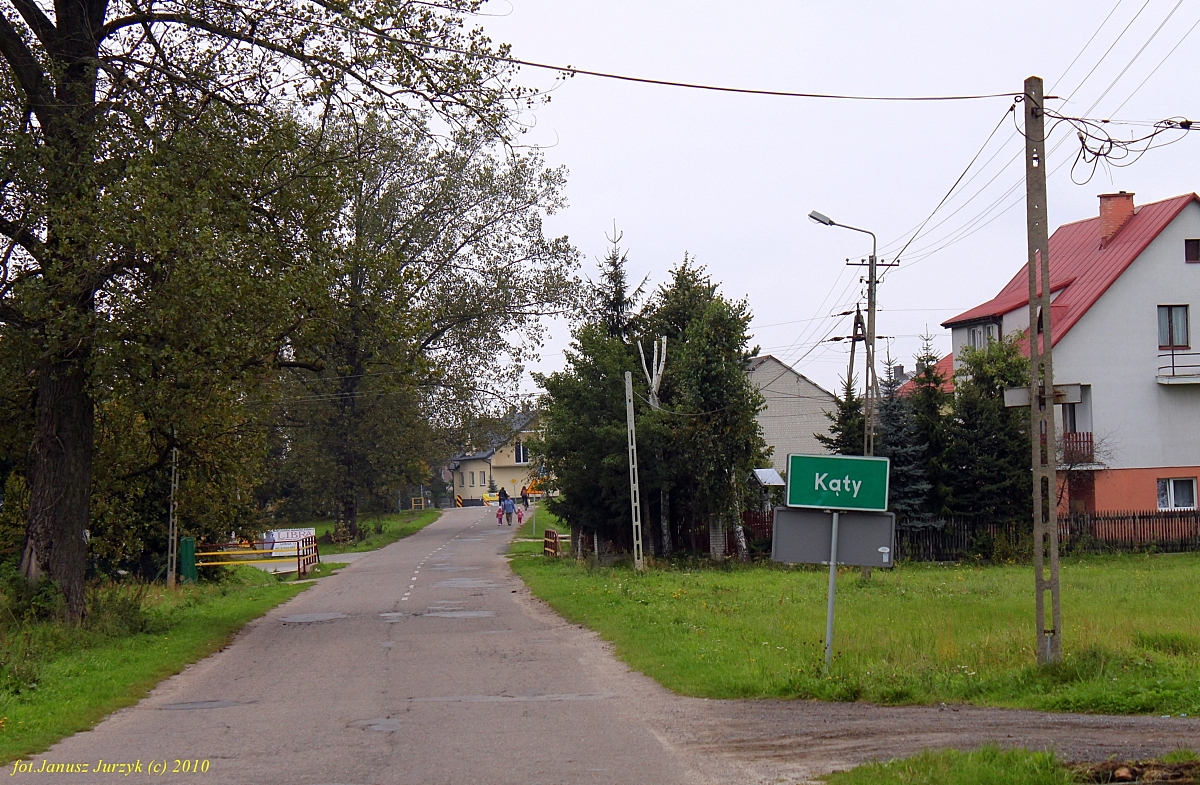
- Road sign in Kąty

- Location within Poland
- Coordinates: 52°00′56″N 21°28′49″E
- Country: Poland
- Voivodeship: Masovian
- County: Otwock
- Gmina: Kołbiel

Population
  - Total: 480
- Time zone: UTC+1 (CET)
  - Summer (DST): UTC+2 (CEST)

Kąty [ˈkɔntɨ] is a village in the administrative district of Gmina Kołbiel, within Otwock County, Masovian Voivodeship, in east-central Poland.

Three Polish citizens were murdered by Nazi Germany in the village during World War II.
