= Śródborów railway station =

Railway station in Otwock, Poland

Otwock Śródborów

General information
- Location: Śródborów, Otwock, Otwock, Masovian; Poland
- Coordinates: 52.1011°N 21.2963°E
- System: Rail Station
- Owner: Polskie Koleje Państwowe S.A.

Services
Preceding station	Masovian Railways	Following station
Otwock towards Warszawa Zachodnia	R7	Pogorzel Warszawska towards Dęblin
Location

Otwock Śródborów railway station is a railway station at Śródborów, Otwock, Otwock, Masovian, Poland. It is served by Masovian Railways.
