= Głupianka =

- Village
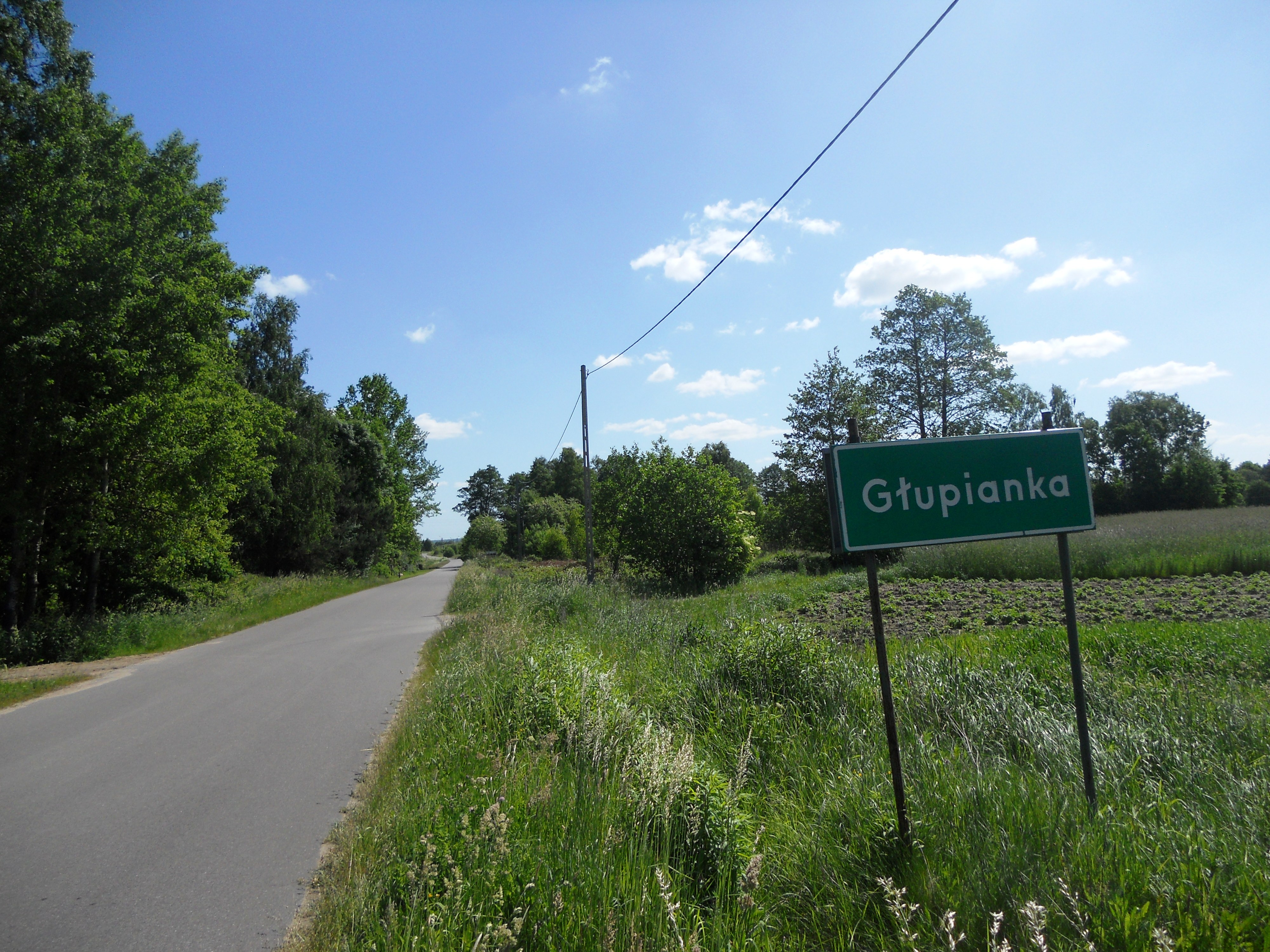

- Location within Poland
- Coordinates: 52°3′28″N 21°33′58.6″E
- Country: Poland
- Voivodeship: Masovian
- County: Otwock
- Gmina: Kołbiel

Głupianka [ɡwuˈpjanka] is a village in the administrative district of Gmina Kołbiel, within Otwock County, Masovian Voivodeship, in east-central Poland.
