= Gózd, Otwock County =

Gózd
- Village
- Location within Poland
- Coordinates: 52°4′N 21°26′E
- Country: Poland
- Voivodeship: Masovian
- County: Otwock
- Gmina: Kołbiel

Gózd [ɡust] is a village in the administrative district of Gmina Kołbiel, within Otwock County, Masovian Voivodeship, in east-central Poland.
