= Lubice =

- Village
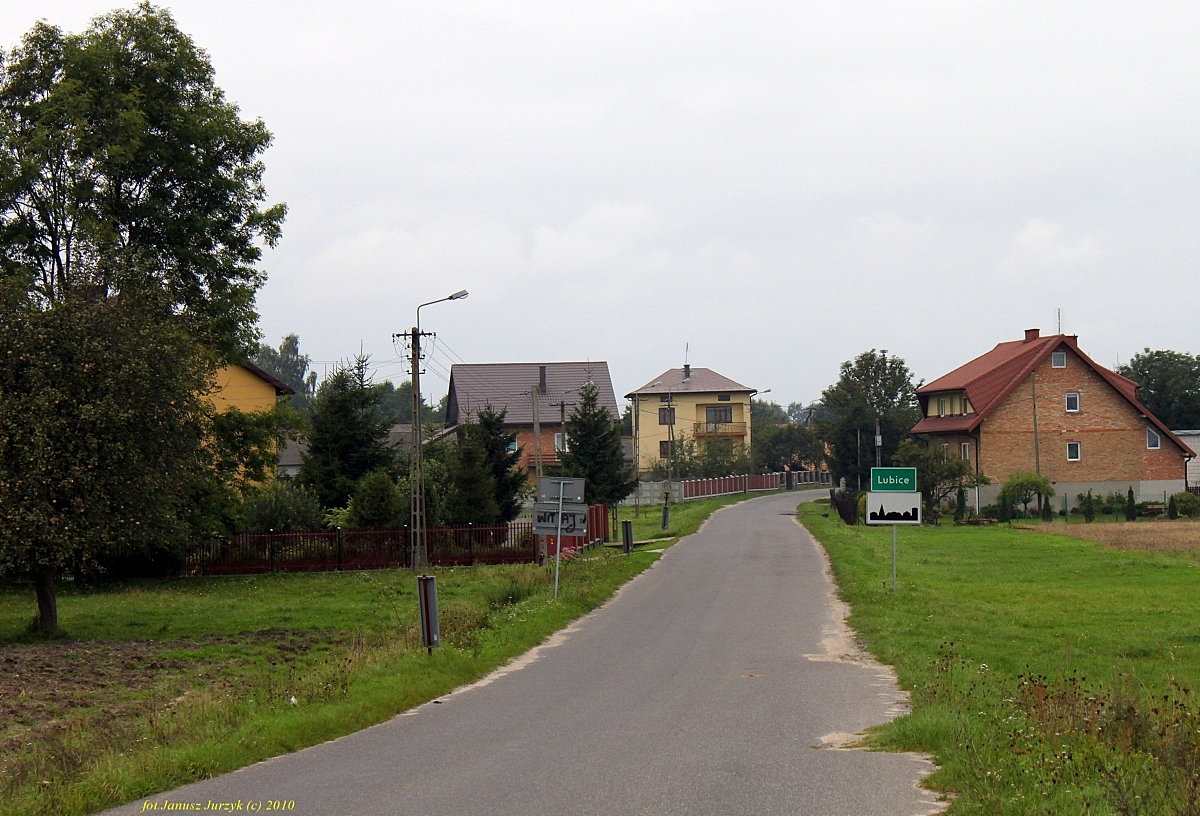
- Lubice

- Location within Poland
- Coordinates: 52°1′N 21°31′E
- Country: Poland
- Voivodeship: Masovian
- County: Otwock
- Gmina: Kołbiel
- Time zone: UTC+1 (CET)
  - Summer (DST): UTC+2 (CEST)

Lubice [luˈbit͡sɛ] is a village in the administrative district of Gmina Kołbiel, within Otwock County, Masovian Voivodeship, in east-central Poland.

Five Polish citizens were murdered by Nazi Germany in the village during World War II.
