= Chrosna, Masovian Voivodeship =

Chrosna
- Village
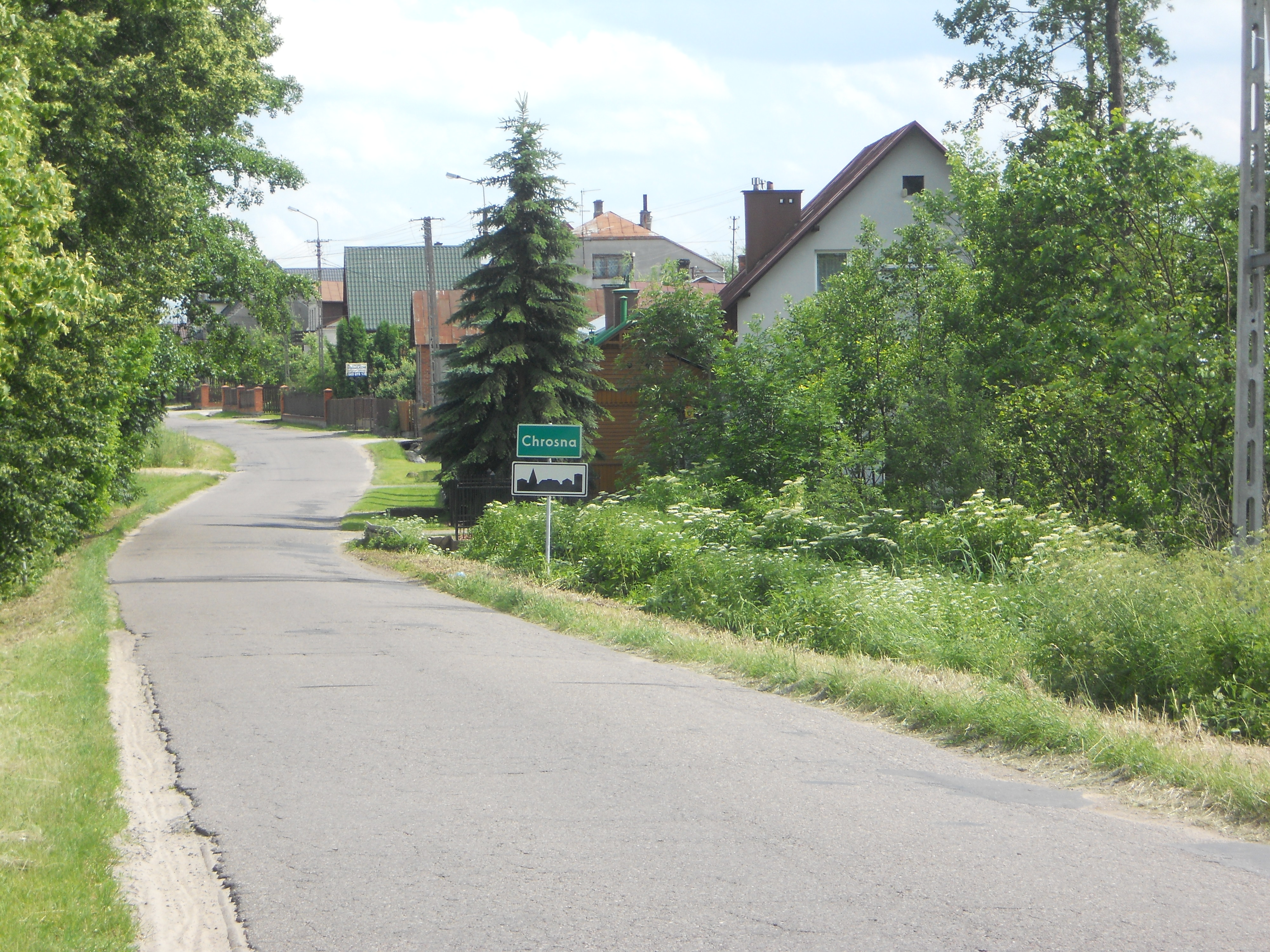

- Location within Poland
- Coordinates: 52°2′N 21°27′E
- Country: Poland
- Voivodeship: Masovian
- County: Otwock
- Gmina: Kołbiel

Chrosna [ˈxrɔsna] is a village in the administrative district of Gmina Kołbiel, within Otwock County, Masovian Voivodeship, in east-central Poland. There is a railway station "Chrosna" near the village.
