= Stojadła =

- Village
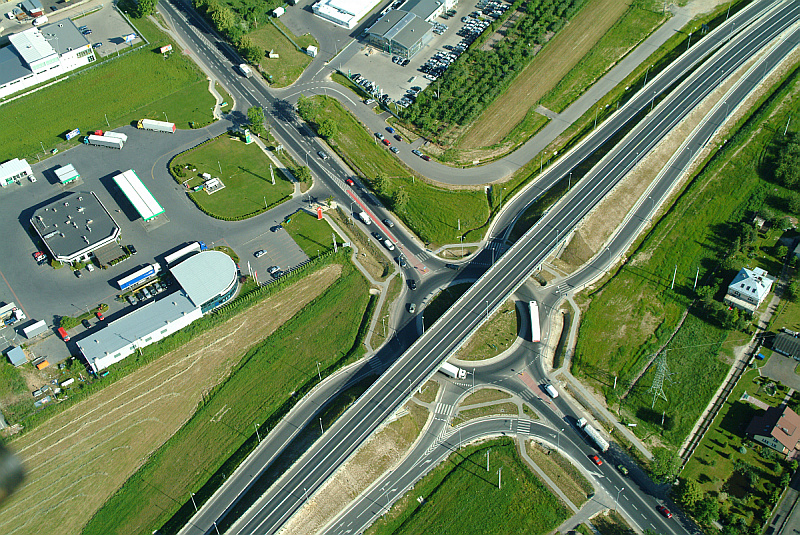
- Crossing of National road 50 with National road 92

- Location within Poland
- Coordinates: 52°11′N 21°32′E
- Country: Poland
- Voivodeship: Masovian
- County: Mińsk
- Gmina: Mińsk Mazowiecki
- Population: 1,223

Stojadła [stɔˈjadwa] is a village in the administrative district of Gmina Mińsk Mazowiecki, within Mińsk County, Masovian Voivodeship, in east-central Poland.
