= Borków, Otwock County =

Borków
- Village
- Location within Poland
- Coordinates: 52°05′11″N 21°28′49″E
- Country: Poland
- Voivodeship: Masovian
- County: Otwock
- Gmina: Kołbiel

Borków [ˈbɔrkuf] is a village in the administrative district of Gmina Kołbiel, within Otwock County, Masovian Voivodeship, in east-central Poland.
