= Antoninek, Masovian Voivodeship =

Antoninek
- Village
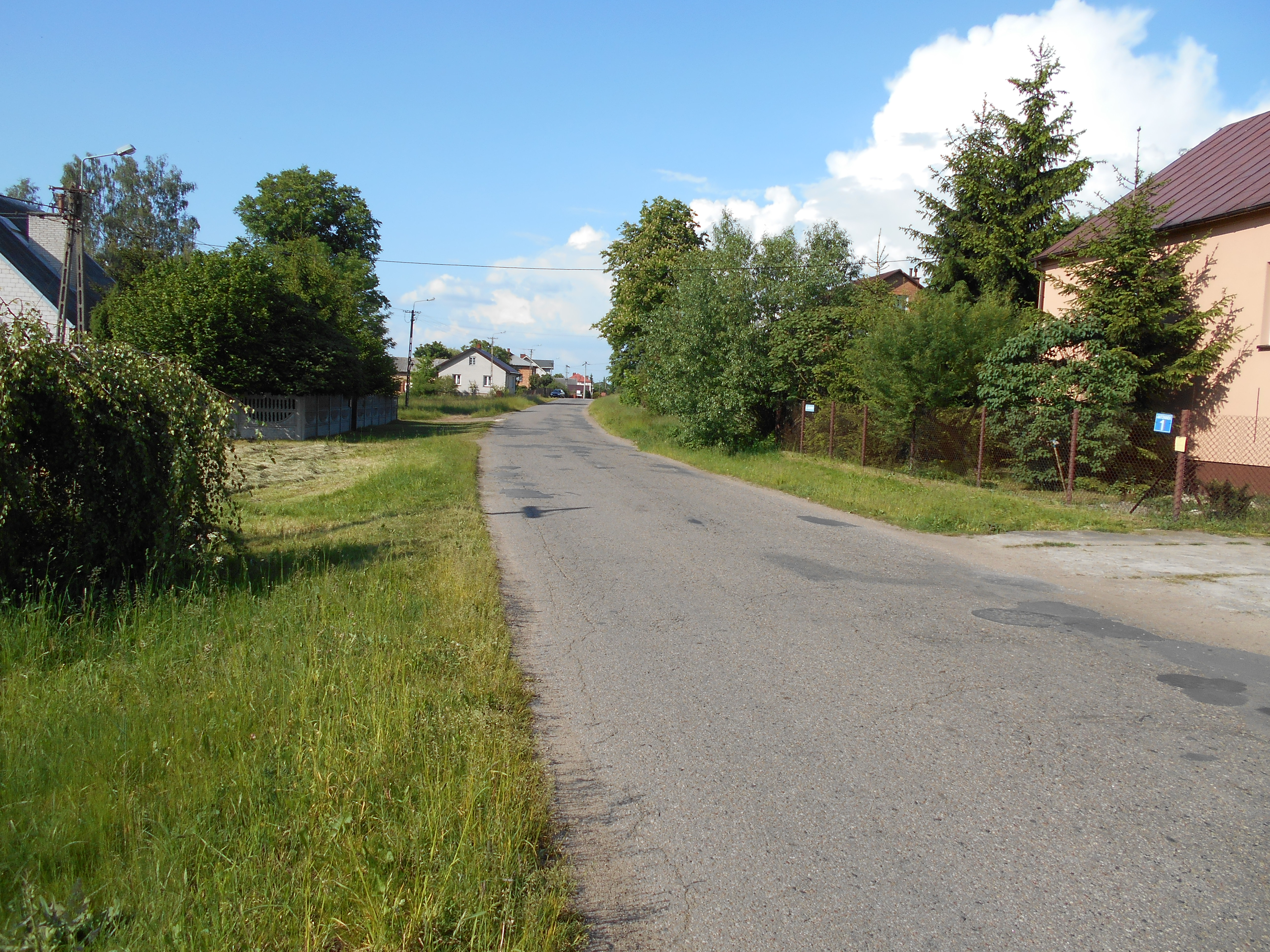

- Location within Poland
- Coordinates: 52°01′56″N 21°28′58″E
- Country: Poland
- Voivodeship: Masovian
- County: Otwock
- Gmina: Kołbiel

Antoninek [antɔˈninɛk] is a village in the administrative district of Gmina Kołbiel, within Otwock County, Masovian Voivodeship, in east-central Poland.
