= Człekówka =

- Village
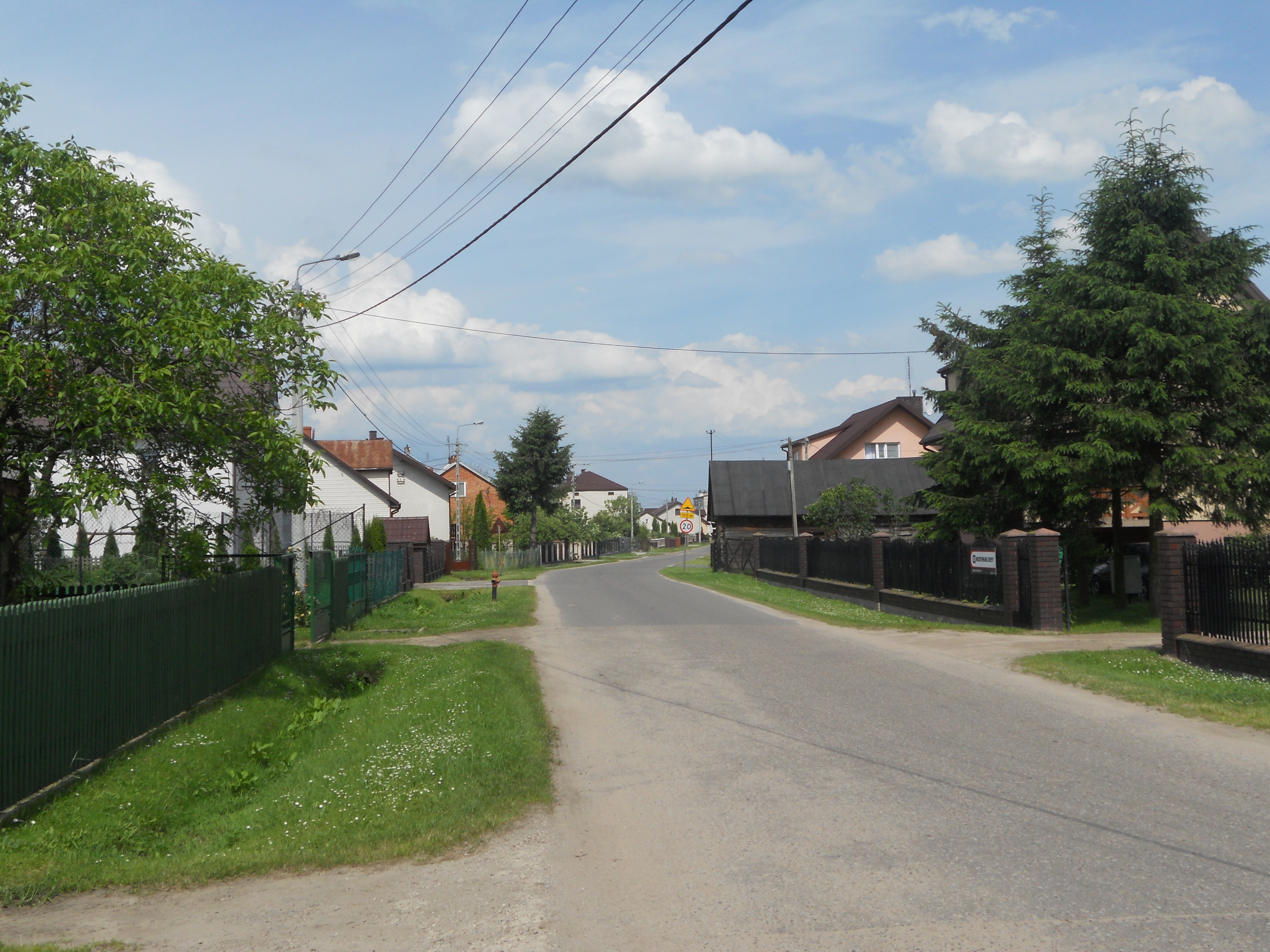

- Location within Poland
- Coordinates: 52°02′50″N 21°26′40″E
- Country: Poland
- Voivodeship: Masovian
- County: Otwock
- Gmina: Kołbiel

Człekówka [t͡ʂwɛˈkufka] is a village in the administrative district of Gmina Kołbiel, within Otwock County, Masovian Voivodeship, in east-central Poland.
