= Jatne =

- Village
- Location within Poland
- Coordinates: 52°6′N 21°24′E
- Country: Poland
- Voivodeship: Masovian
- County: Otwock
- Gmina: Celestynów

Jatne [ˈjatnɛ] is a village in the administrative district of Gmina Celestynów, within Otwock County, Masovian Voivodeship, in east-central Poland. The first mention of the village dates back to 1866. During the years 1975-1998 the town administratively belonged to the province of Warsaw.
