= Sufczyn, Masovian Voivodeship =

Sufczyn
- Village
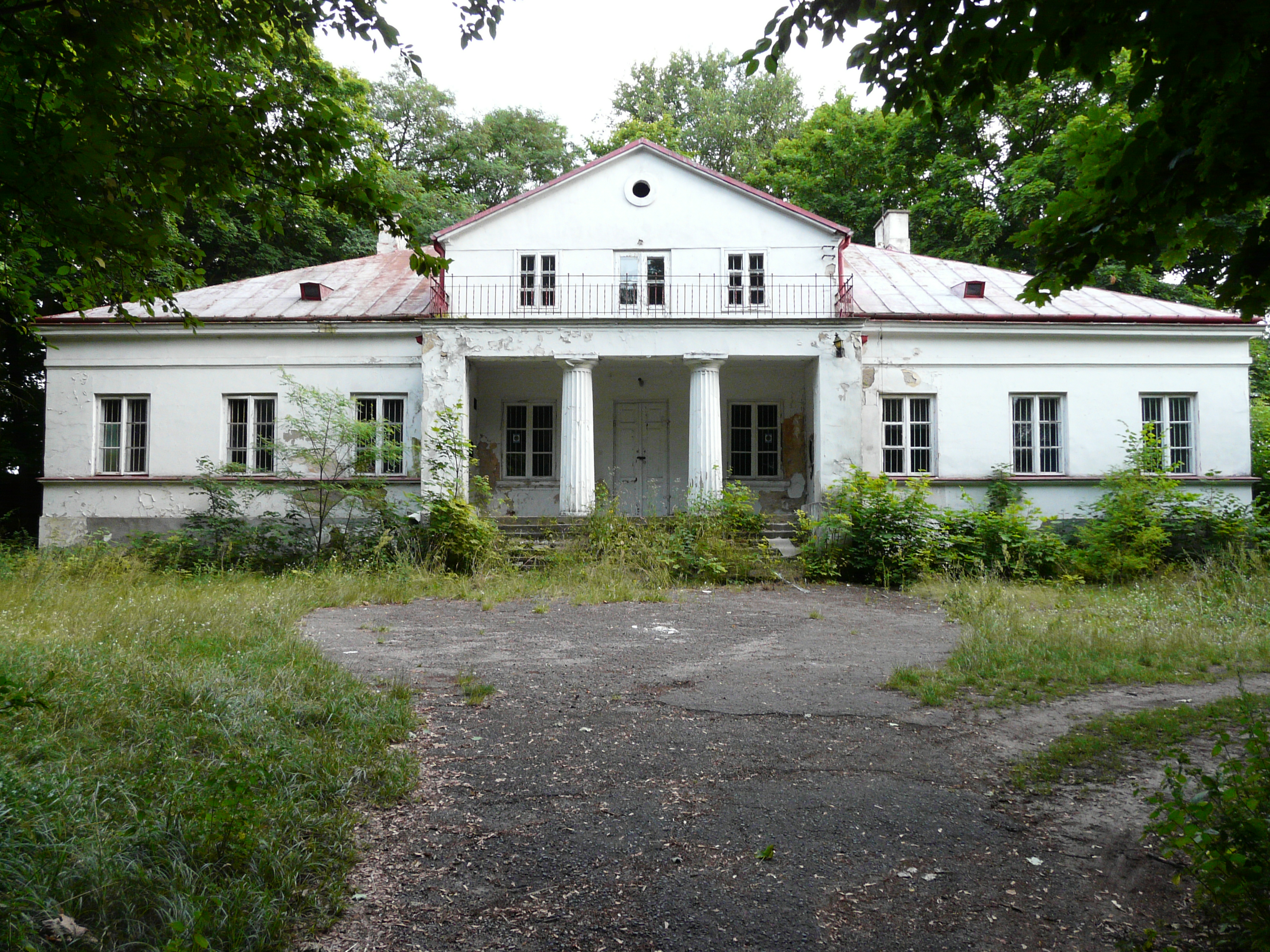
- Manor house in Sufczyn

- Location within Poland
- Coordinates: 52°2′40″N 21°31′48″E
- Country: Poland
- Voivodeship: Masovian
- County: Otwock
- Gmina: Kołbiel
- Elevation: 127 m (417 ft)
- Population: 340

Sufczyn [ˈsuft͡ʂɨn] is a village in the administrative district of Gmina Kołbiel, within Otwock County, Masovian Voivodeship, in east-central Poland.
