= Rudzienko, Otwock County =

Rudzienko
- Village
- Location within Poland
- Coordinates: 52°6′25″N 21°29′31″E
- Country: Poland
- Voivodeship: Masovian
- County: Otwock
- Gmina: Kołbiel
- Population: 800

Rudzienko [ruˈd͡ʑɛŋkɔ] is a village in the administrative district of Gmina Kołbiel, within Otwock County, Masovian Voivodeship, in east-central Poland.
