= Sępochów =

- Village
- Location within Poland
- Coordinates: 52°5′N 21°28′E
- Country: Poland
- Voivodeship: Masovian
- County: Otwock
- Gmina: Kołbiel

Sępochów [sɛmˈpɔxuf] is a village in the administrative district of Gmina Kołbiel, within Otwock County, Masovian Voivodeship, in east-central Poland.
