= Teresin, Otwock County =

Teresin
- Village
- Location within Poland
- Coordinates: 52°6′N 21°31′E
- Country: Poland
- Voivodeship: Masovian
- County: Otwock
- Gmina: Kołbiel

Teresin (Polish pronunciation: [tɛˈrɛɕin]) is a village in the administrative district of Gmina Kołbiel, within Otwock County, Masovian Voivodeship, in east-central Poland.
