= Dąbrówka, Otwock County =

Dąbrówka
- Village
- Location within Poland
- Coordinates: 52°4′N 21°21′E
- Country: Poland
- Voivodeship: Masovian
- County: Otwock
- Gmina: Celestynów
- Time zone: UTC+1 (CET)
  - Summer (DST): UTC+2 (CEST)

Dąbrówka [dɔmˈbrufka] is a village in the administrative district of Gmina Celestynów, within Otwock County, Masovian Voivodeship, in east-central Poland.

Six Polish citizens were murdered by Nazi Germany in the village during World War II.
