= Rudno, Otwock County =

Rudno
- Village
- Location within Poland
- Coordinates: 52°5′N 21°30′E
- Country: Poland
- Voivodeship: Masovian
- County: Otwock
- Gmina: Kołbiel

Rudno [ˈrudnɔ] is a village in the administrative district of Gmina Kołbiel, within Otwock County, Masovian Voivodeship, in east-central Poland.
