= Ponurzyca =

- Village
- Location within Poland
- Coordinates: 52°0′N 21°25′E
- Country: Poland
- Voivodeship: Masovian
- County: Otwock
- Gmina: Celestynów

Ponurzyca [pɔnuˈʐɨt͡sa] is a village in the administrative district of Gmina Celestynów, within Otwock County, Masovian Voivodeship, in east-central Poland.
