= Dyzin =

- Village
- Location within Poland
- Coordinates: 52°5′N 21°23′E
- Country: Poland
- Voivodeship: Masovian
- County: Otwock
- Gmina: Celestynów

Dyzin [ˈdɨʑin] is a village in the administrative district of Gmina Celestynów, within Otwock County, Masovian Voivodeship, in east-central Poland. As of 2014, the village had a population of 257.
