= Radachówka =

- Village
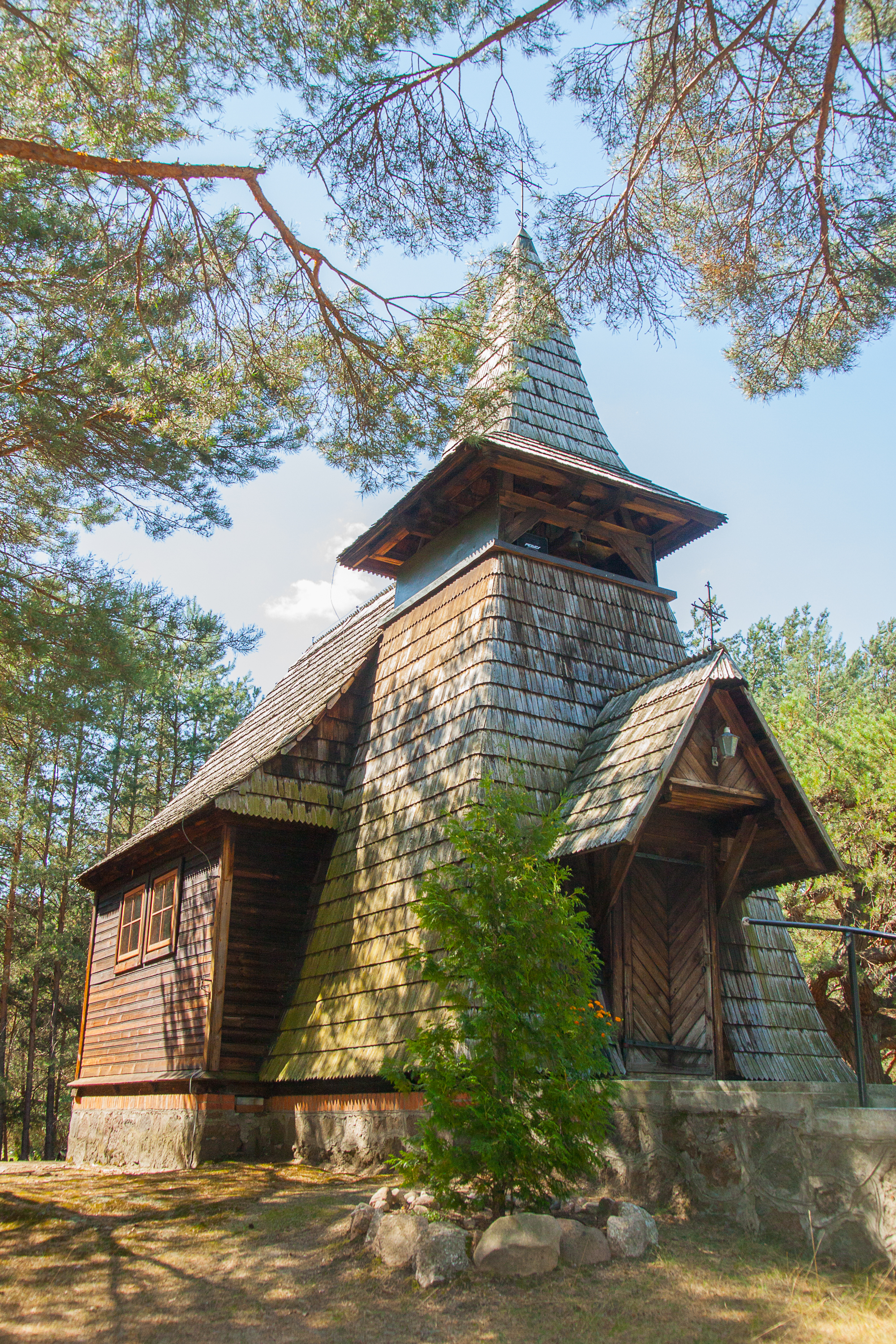
- Our Lady of Częstochowa Chapel

- Location within Poland
- Coordinates: 52°02′40″N 21°34′14″E
- Country: Poland
- Voivodeship: Masovian
- County: Otwock
- Gmina: Kołbiel

Radachówka [radaˈxufka] is a village in the administrative district of Gmina Kołbiel, within Otwock County, Masovian Voivodeship, in east-central Poland.
