= Wola Sufczyńska =

- Village
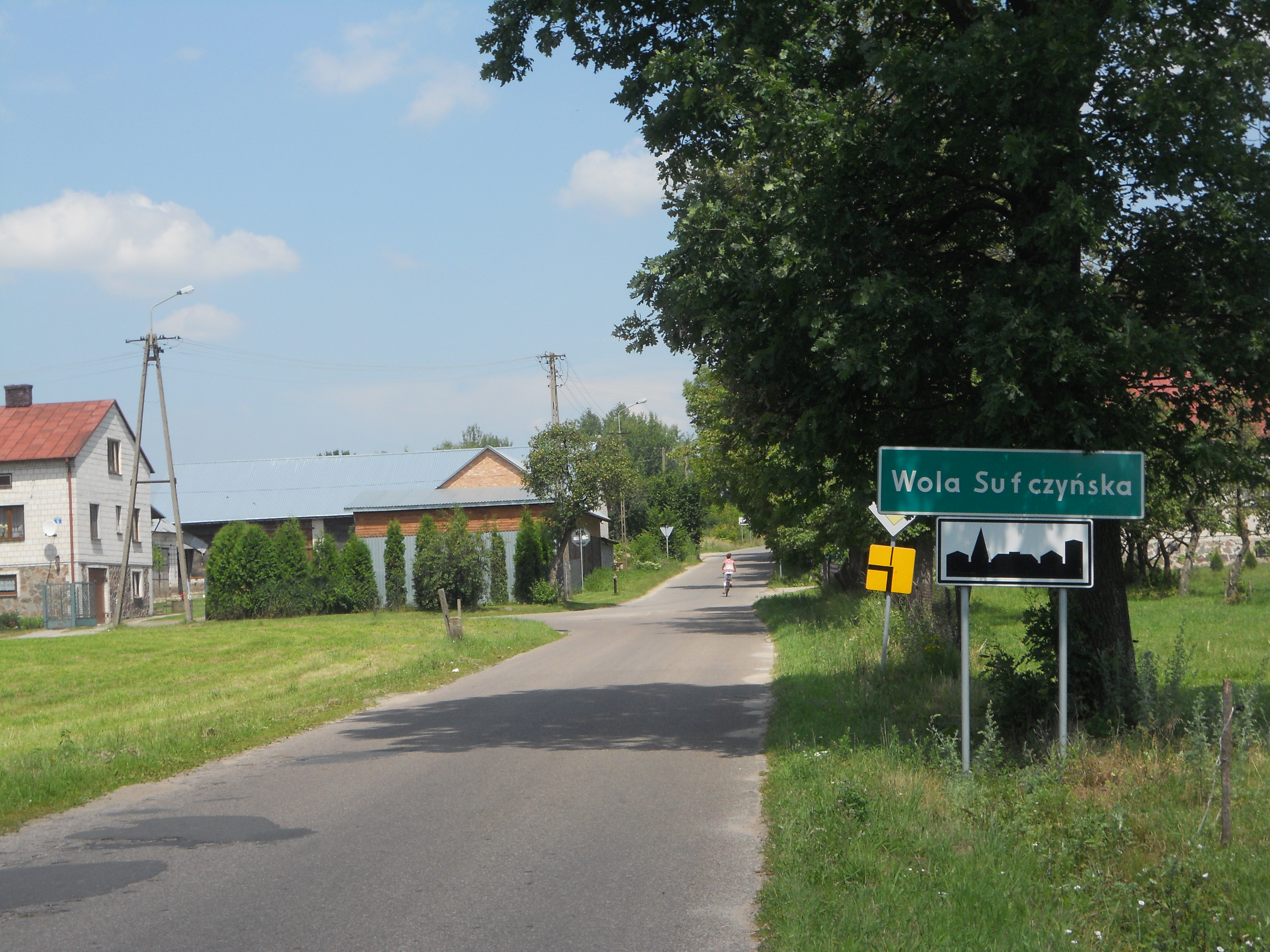
- Wola Sufczyńska

- Location within Poland
- Coordinates: 52°3′N 21°31′E
- Country: Poland
- Voivodeship: Masovian
- County: Otwock
- Gmina: Kołbiel

Wola Sufczyńska [ˈvɔla sufˈt͡ʂɨɲska] is a village in the administrative district of Gmina Kołbiel, within Otwock County, Masovian Voivodeship, in east-central Poland.
