= Ostrowik, Otwock County =

Ostrowik
- Village
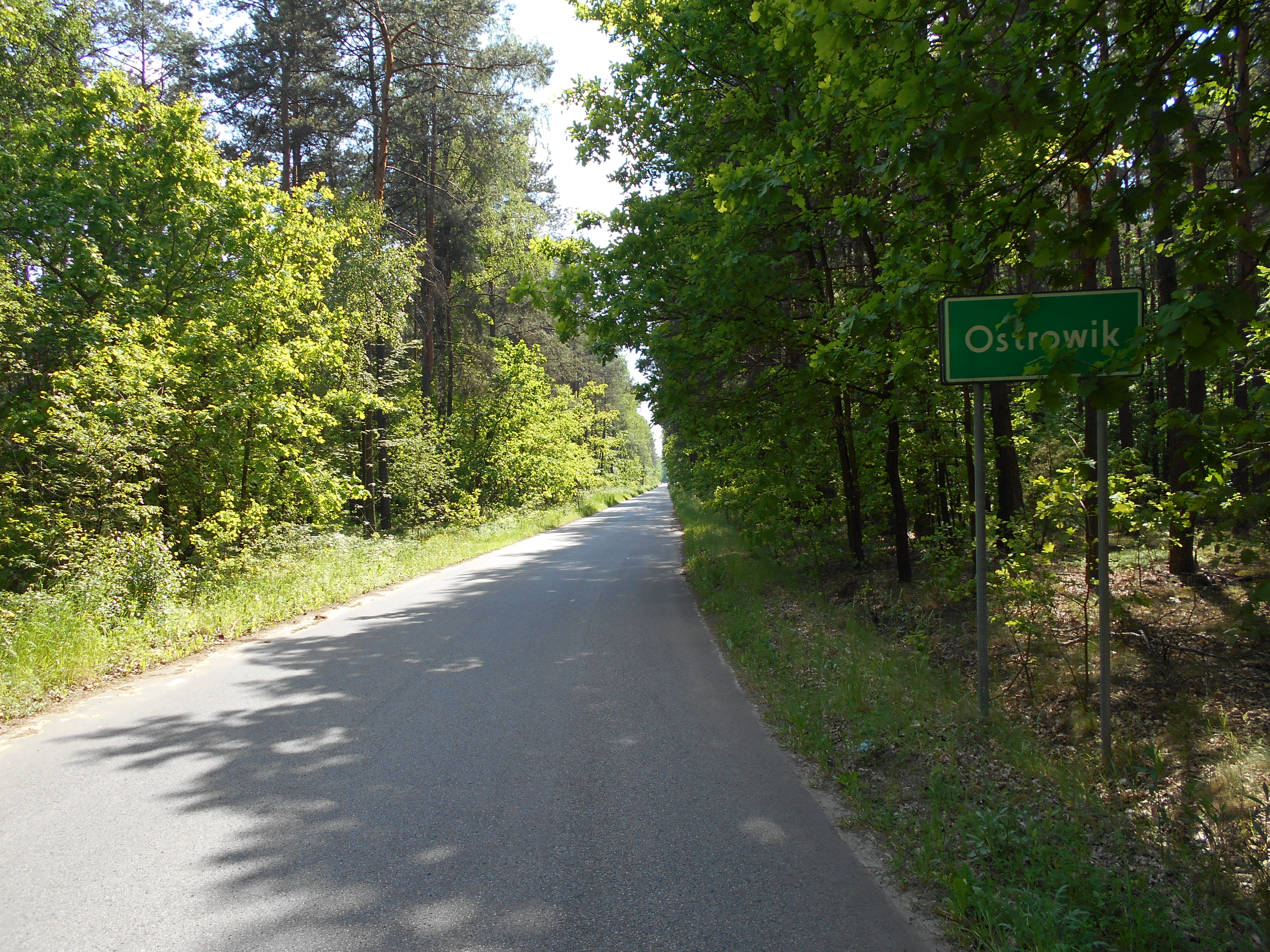
- Ostrowik.

- Location within Poland
- Coordinates: 52°05′17″N 21°24′35″E
- Country: Poland
- Voivodeship: Masovian
- County: Otwock
- Gmina: Celestynów

Ostrowik [ɔsˈtrɔvik] is a village in the administrative district of Gmina Celestynów, within Otwock County, Masovian Voivodeship, in east-central Poland.
