= Oleksin, Otwock County =

Oleksin
- Village
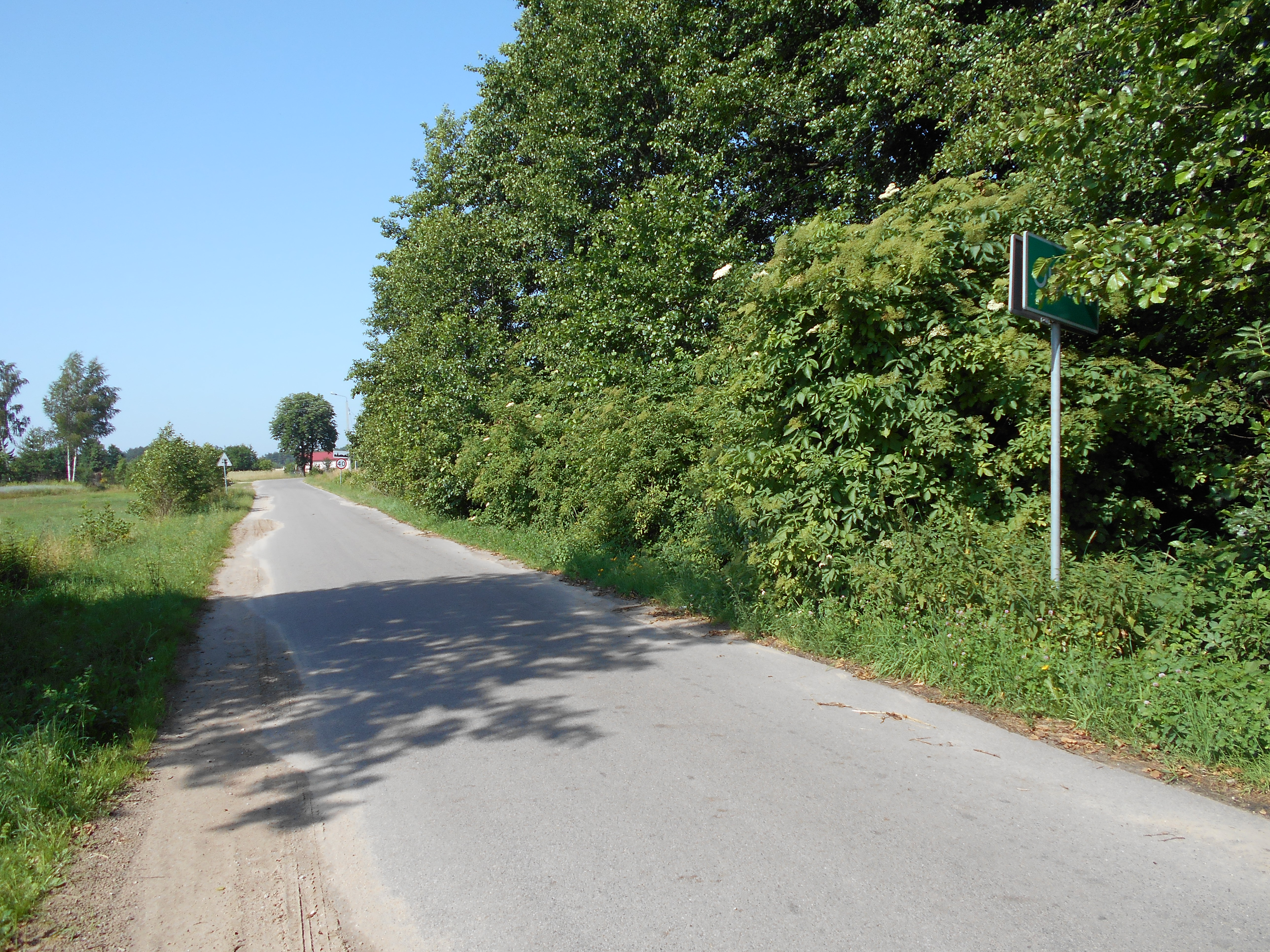
- Road in Oleksin

- Location within Poland
- Coordinates: 52°06′01″N 21°30′58″E
- Country: Poland
- Voivodeship: Masovian
- County: Otwock
- Gmina: Kołbiel

Oleksin [ɔˈlɛkɕin] is a village in the administrative district of Gmina Kołbiel, within Otwock County, Masovian Voivodeship, in east-central Poland.
