= Pogorzel, Gmina Celestynów =

Pogorzel
- Village
- Location within Poland
- Coordinates: 52°5′49″N 21°20′26″E
- Country: Poland
- Voivodeship: Masovian
- County: Otwock
- Gmina: Celestynów

Pogorzel [pɔˈɡɔʐɛl] is a village in the administrative district of Gmina Celestynów, within Otwock County, Masovian Voivodeship, in east-central Poland.
