= Bocian, Masovian Voivodeship =

Bocian
- Village
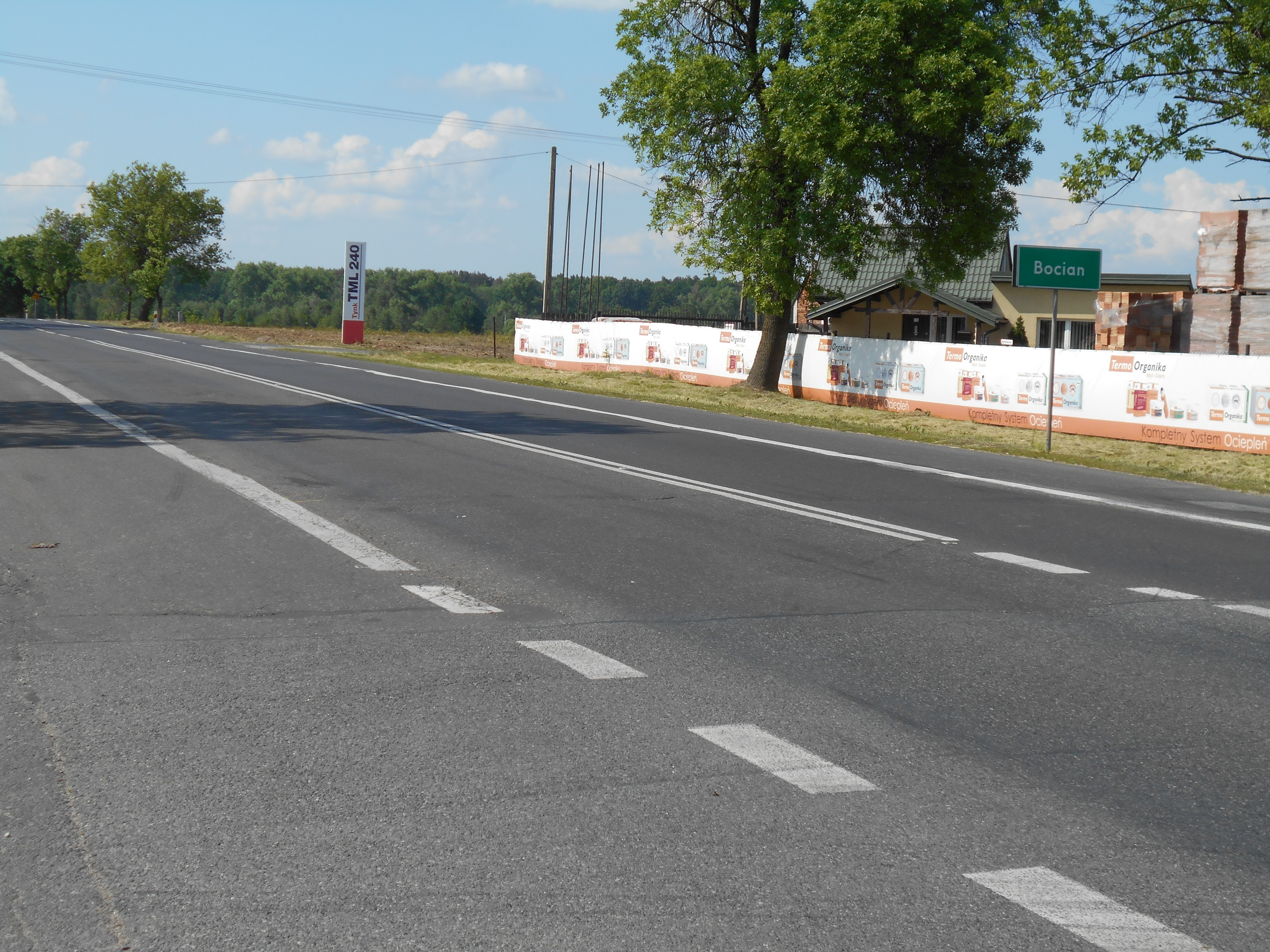

- Location within Poland
- Coordinates: 52°04′35″N 21°26′02″E
- Country: Poland
- Voivodeship: Masovian
- County: Otwock
- Gmina: Kołbiel

Bocian [ˈbɔt͡ɕan] is a village in the administrative district of Gmina Kołbiel, within Otwock County, Masovian Voivodeship, in east-central Poland.
