= Augustówka, Otwock County =

Augustówka
- Village
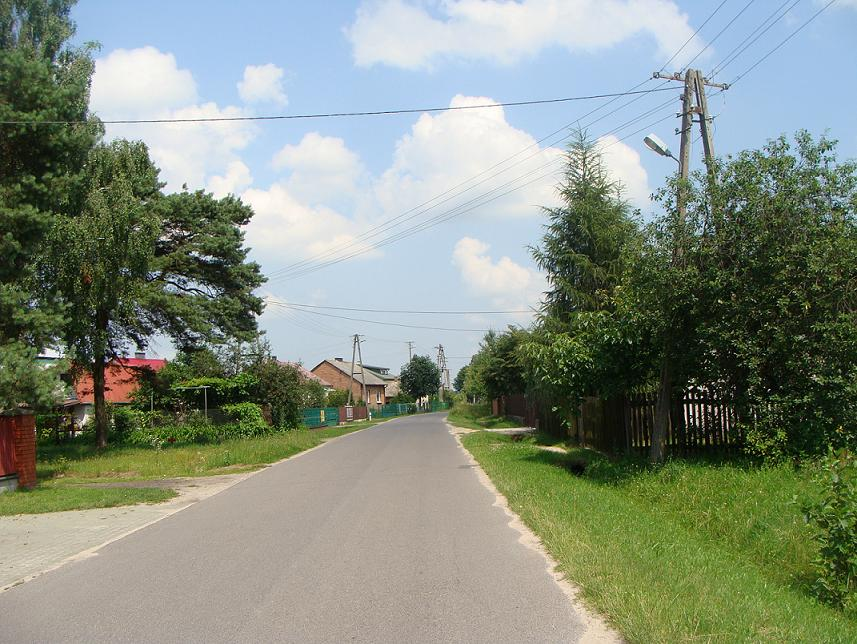

- Location within Poland
- Coordinates: 51°58′00″N 21°25′00″E
- Country: Poland
- Voivodeship: Masovian
- County: Otwock
- Gmina: Osieck

Augustówka [auɡusˈtufka] is a village in the administrative district of Gmina Osieck, within Otwock County, Masovian Voivodeship, in east-central Poland.
