= Gmina Kołbiel =

Gmina Kołbiel Kołbiel Commune
- Gmina
- Flag Coat of arms
- Interactive map of Gmina Kołbiel
- Coordinates (Kołbiel): 52°4′0″N 21°29′0″E
- Country: Poland
- Voivodeship: Masovian
- County: Otwock
- Seat: Kołbiel

Area
  - Total: 106.44 km^{2} (41.10 sq mi)

Population (2006)
  - Total: 7,980
  - Density: 75.0/km^{2} (194/sq mi)
- Website: http://www.kolbiel.pl

Gmina Kołbiel is a rural gmina (administrative district) in Otwock County, Masovian Voivodeship, in east-central Poland. Its seat is the village of Kołbiel, which lies approximately 16 kilometres (10 mi) east of Otwock and 37 km (23 mi) south-east of Warsaw.

The gmina covers an area of 106.44 square kilometres (41.1 sq mi), and as of 2006 its total population is 7,980.

The gmina contains part of the protected area called Masovian Landscape Park.

== Villages ==
Gmina Kołbiel contains the villages and settlements of Antoninek, Bocian, Borków, Chrosna, Chrząszczówka, Człekówka, Dobrzyniec, Gadka, Głupianka, Gózd, Karpiska, Kąty, Kołbiel, Lubice, Nowa Wieś, Oleksin, Podgórzno, Radachówka, Rudno, Rudzienko, Sępochów, Siwianka, Skorupy, Stara Wieś Druga, Sufczyn, Teresin, Władzin and Wola Sufczyńska.

== Neighbouring gminas ==
Gmina Kołbiel is bordered by the gminas of Celestynów, Mińsk Mazowiecki, Osieck, Pilawa, Siennica and Wiązowna.
