= Regut =

- Village
- Location within Poland
- Coordinates: 52°2′N 21°23′E
- Country: Poland
- Voivodeship: Masovian
- County: Otwock
- Gmina: Celestynów
- Population: 590
- Website: http://www.regutcity.friko.pl

Regut [ˈrɛɡut] is a village in the administrative district of Gmina Celestynów, within Otwock County, Masovian Voivodeship, in east-central Poland.

The village is home to the sports club RKS Bór Regut. From 1975 to 1998 the village was in Warsaw Voivodeship, which is now part of Masovian Voivodeship.
