= Stara Wieś, Otwock County =

Stara Wieś
- Village
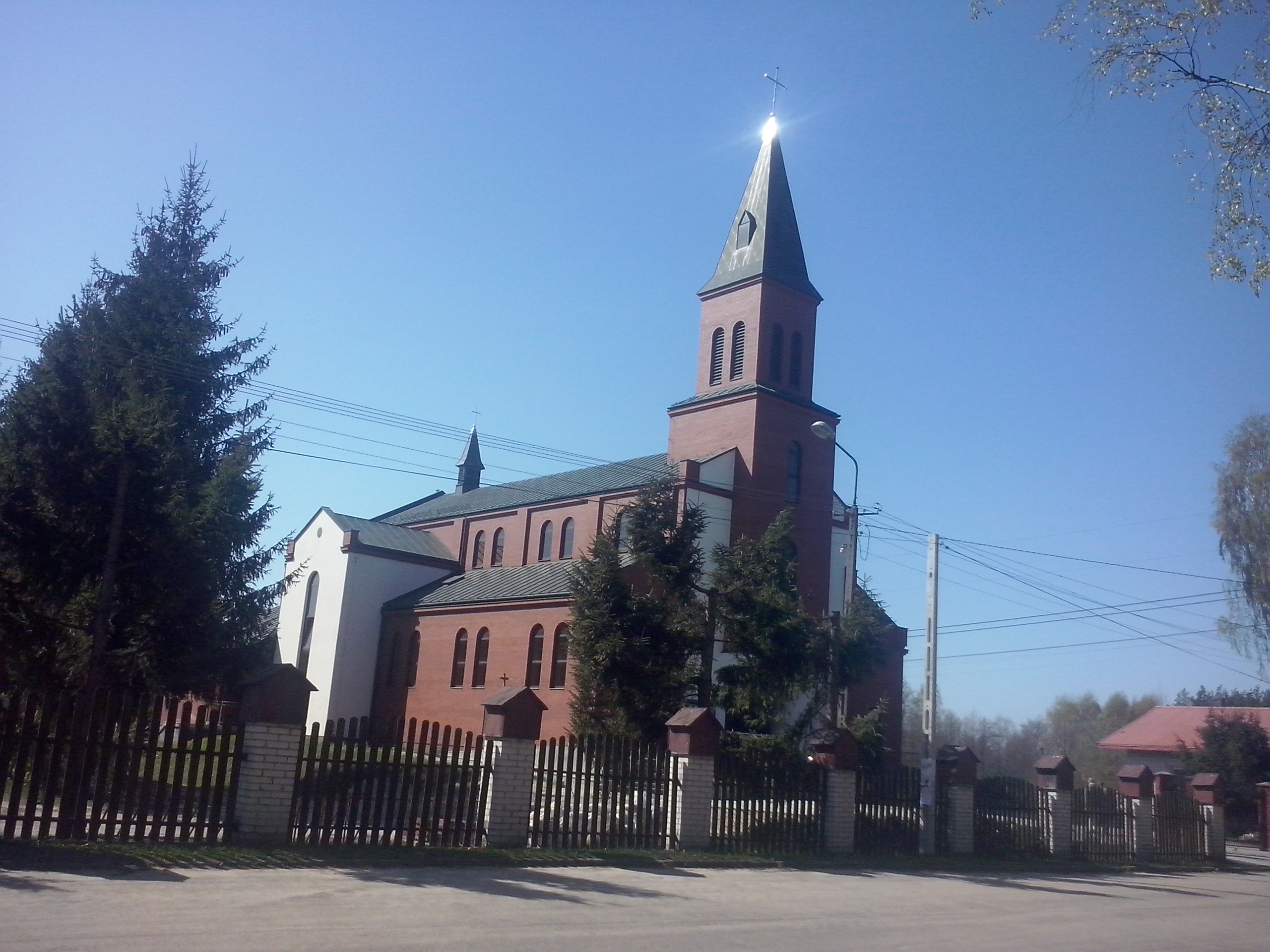

- Location within Poland
- Coordinates: 52°04′48″N 21°21′16″E
- Country: Poland
- Voivodeship: Masovian
- County: Otwock
- Gmina: Celestynów
- Population: 540

Stara Wieś [ˈstara ˈvjɛɕ] is a village in the administrative district of Gmina Celestynów, within Otwock County, Masovian Voivodeship, in east-central Poland.
