= Kołbiel =

- Village
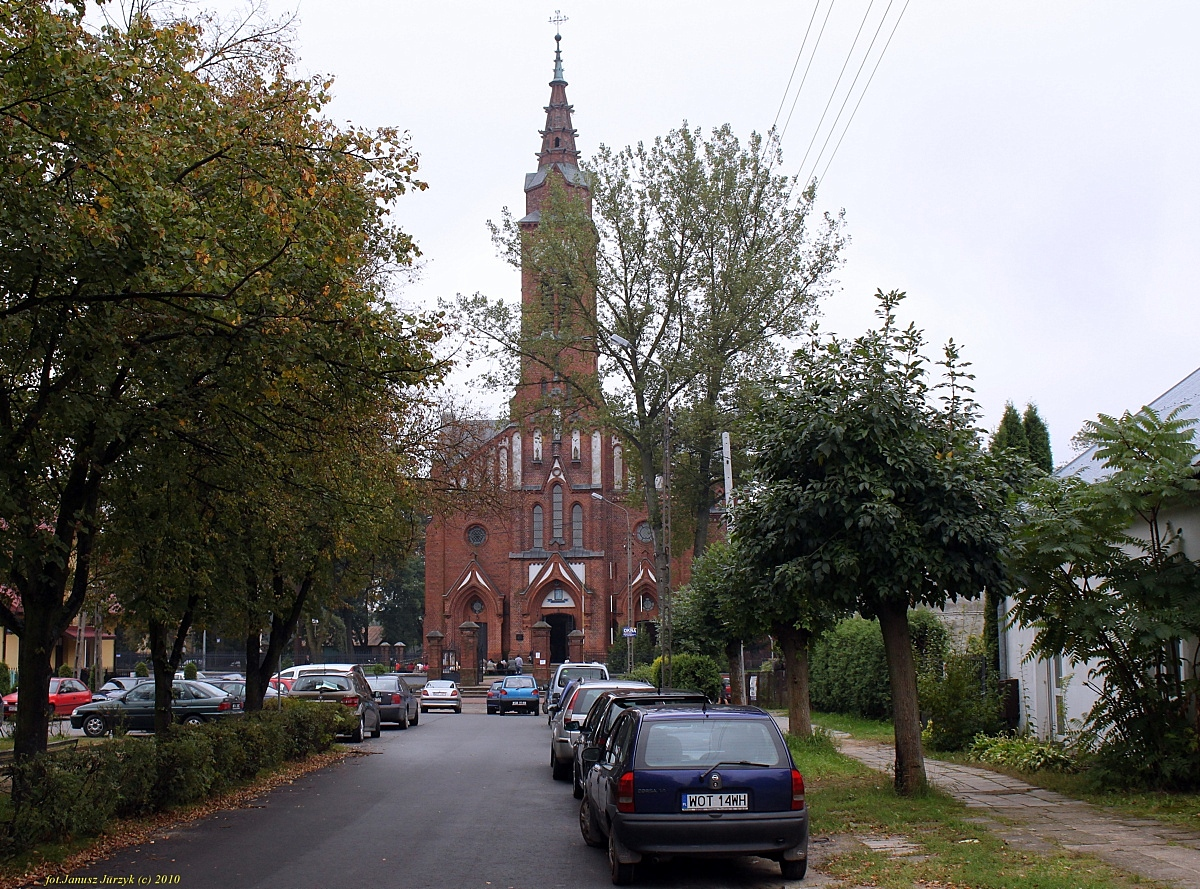
- Holy Trinity Church

- Coat of arms

- Location within Poland
- Coordinates: 52°4′N 21°29′E
- Country: Poland
- Voivodeship: Masovian
- County: Otwock
- Gmina: Kołbiel
- Elevation: 126 m (413 ft)
- Population: 1,880 (2,011)
- Website: http://www.kolbiel.pl

Kołbiel [ˈkɔu̯bjɛl] (to 1986 known as Stara Wieś Pierwsza (Old Village First)) is a village in Otwock County, Masovian Voivodeship, in east-central Poland. It is the seat of the gmina (administrative district) called Gmina Kołbiel. In 1532, Kołbiel was granted city rights by Sigismund I Old, King of Poland. Kołbiel lost its city status in 1869 by tsarist decree.

== Transport ==
The village lies at the intersection of expressway S17 and national road 50 (future A50 motorway).
