= National road 50 (Poland) =

National road in Poland

Coordinates: 52°01′52″N 21°19′11″E

National Road 50
- Droga krajowa nr 50

Route information
- Maintained by GDDKiA
- Length: 297 km (185 mi)

Major junctions
- From: Ciechanów
- To: Ostrów Mazowiecka

Location
- Country: Poland
- Regions: Masovian Voivodeship
- Major cities: Płońsk, Sochaczew, Grójec, Mińsk Mazowiecki

Highway system
- National roads in Poland; Voivodeship roads
← DK 49	→ DK 51

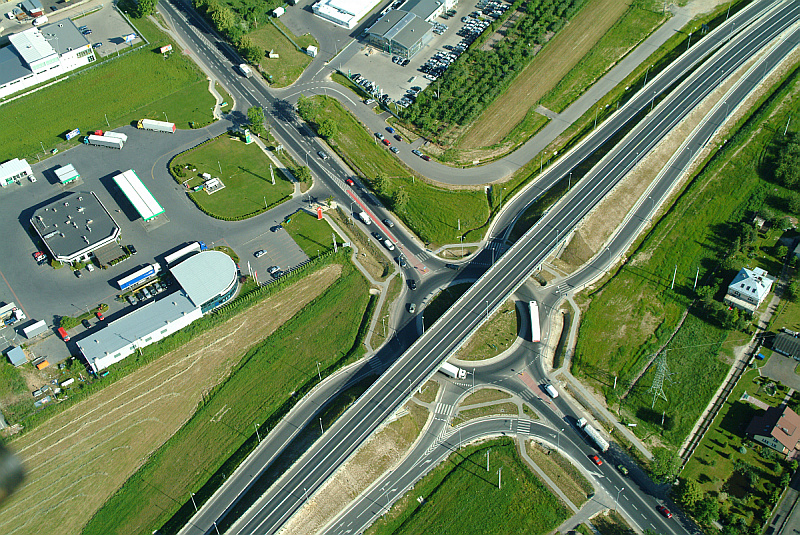
National road 50 in Stojadła, near Mińsk Mazowiecki

National road 50 (Polish: Droga krajowa nr 50) is a route belonging to the Polish national road network. The highway forms a part of bypass of Warsaw metropolitan area, running from 29 to 84 km away from centre of Warsaw. The route has two bridges over Vistula, one in Wyszogród and another in Góra Kalwaria.

Because of the heavy traffic (road is used as a detour for trucks due to restrictions in Warsaw), the highway was completely reconstructed and has a few bypasses along major and smaller towns.

== A50 motorway ==
A new parallel route from the Central Airport to Mińsk Mazowiecki is planned as the A50.

== S50 expressway ==
A new route with expressway status is planned from the Central Airport via Sochaczew, Wyszogród and Radzymin to near Mińsk Mazowiecki. Together, the planned A50 and S50 will form a new ring road around Warsaw, replacing the current ring.

== Major cities and towns along the route ==
- Ciechanów (road 60)
- Płońsk (expressway S7, road 10) – bypass
- Wyszogród (road 62)
- Sochaczew (road 92) – bypass
- Żyrardów – bypass
- Mszczonów (expressway S8)
- Grójec (expressway S7)
- Góra Kalwaria (road 79) – bypass under construction
- Kołbiel (road 17) – planned bypass
- Stojadła (road 92) – bypass
- Mińsk Mazowiecki (motorway A2) – bypass
- Łochów (road 62)
- Ostrów Mazowiecka (expressway S8)

== Axle load limit ==
National road 50 has an axle limit restrictions:

Road sign	Allowed axle load	Stretch
	up to 10 tons	Mińsk Mazowiecki DK 2 (junction „Mińsk Mazowiecki”) – Łochów – Ostrów Mazowiecka DK 8 (junction „Brok”)
	up to 8 tons	Ciechanów DK 60 – Płońsk DK 7 (junction „Ciechanów”)

Between Płońsk and Mińsk Mazowiecki the allowed axle limit is up to 11.5 tons, which is a standard limit on Polish national roads.
