= Celestynów, Otwock County =

Celestynów
- Village
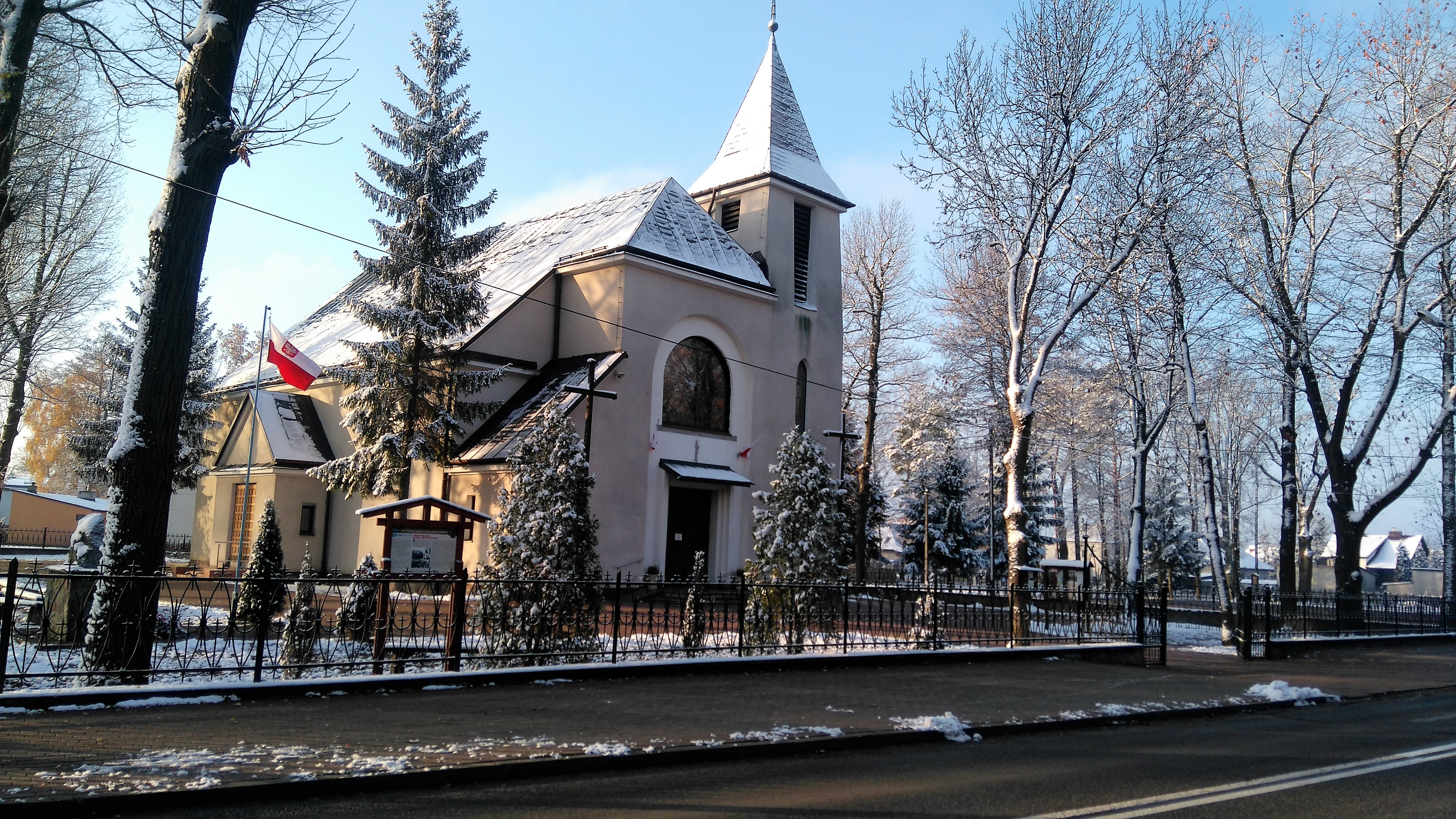
- Church of the Assumption of the Blessed Virgin Mary

- Flag Coat of arms

- Location within Poland
- Coordinates: 52°3′N 21°23′E
- Country: Poland
- Voivodeship: Masovian
- County: Otwock
- Gmina: Celestynów

Population
  - Total: 4,000

Celestynów [t͡sɛlɛsˈtɨnuf] is a village in Otwock County, Masovian Voivodeship, in east-central Poland. It is the seat of the gmina (administrative district) called Gmina Celestynów.
