= Gmina Celestynów =

Gmina Celestynów Celestynów Commune
- Gmina
- Flag Coat of arms

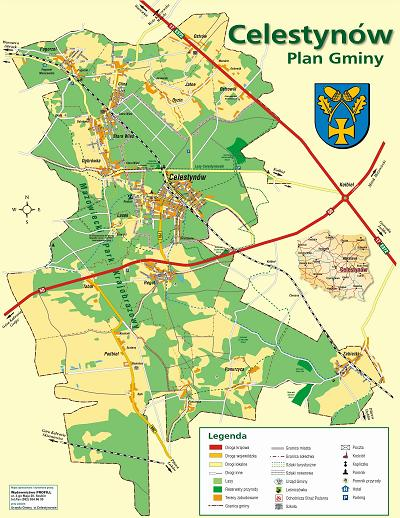
- Coordinates (Celestynów): 52°3′N 21°23′E
- Country: Poland
- Voivodeship: Masovian
- County: Otwock
- Seat: Celestynów

Area
  - Total: 88.92 km^{2} (34.33 sq mi)

Population (2006)
  - Total: 11,032
  - Density: 124.1/km^{2} (321.3/sq mi)
- Website: http://www.celestynow.pl

Gmina Celestynów is a rural gmina (administrative district) in Otwock County, Masovian Voivodeship, in east-central Poland. Its seat is the village of Celestynów, which lies approximately 11 kilometres (7 mi) south-east of Otwock and 33 km (21 mi) south-east of Warsaw.

The gmina covers an area of 88.92 square kilometres (34.3 sq mi), and as of 2006 its total population is 11,032.

The gmina contains part of the protected area called Masovian Landscape Park.

== Villages ==
Gmina Celestynów contains the villages and settlements of Celestynów, Dąbrówka, Dyzin, Glina, Jatne, Lasek, Ostrów, Ostrowik, Podbiel, Pogorzel, Ponurzyca, Regut, Stara Wieś, Tabor and Zabieżki.

== Neighbouring gminas ==
Gmina Celestynów is bordered by the town of Otwock and by the gminas of Karczew, Kołbiel, Osieck, Sobienie-Jeziory and Wiązowna.
