= A2 autostrada (Poland) =

Motorway in Poland connecting Poznań, Łódź and Warsaw with Germany and Belarus

Autostrada A2
- Autostrada Wolności
- A2 Existing sections (Autostrada A2) Existing sections (Expressway S2) Under construction Planned sections

Route information
- Part of E30gra
- Maintained by GDDKiA (Konin - Kukuryki); Autostrada Wielkopolska (Świecko – Konin)
- Length: 475 km (295 mi) 610 km (379 mi) planned

Major junctions
- From: near Świecko; circa 3.9 kilometres (2.4 mi) away from border with Germany
- near Świebodzin west of Poznań in Poznań east of Poznań near Zgierz (indirectly) near Łódź west of Warsaw east of Warsaw near Międzyrzec Podlaski (partially operational)
- To: – border with Belarus at Kukuryki, near Terespol/Brest (planned)

Location
- Country: Poland
- Major cities: Poznań, Łódź, Warsaw

Highway system
- National roads in Poland; Voivodeship roads
← A 1	→ A 4

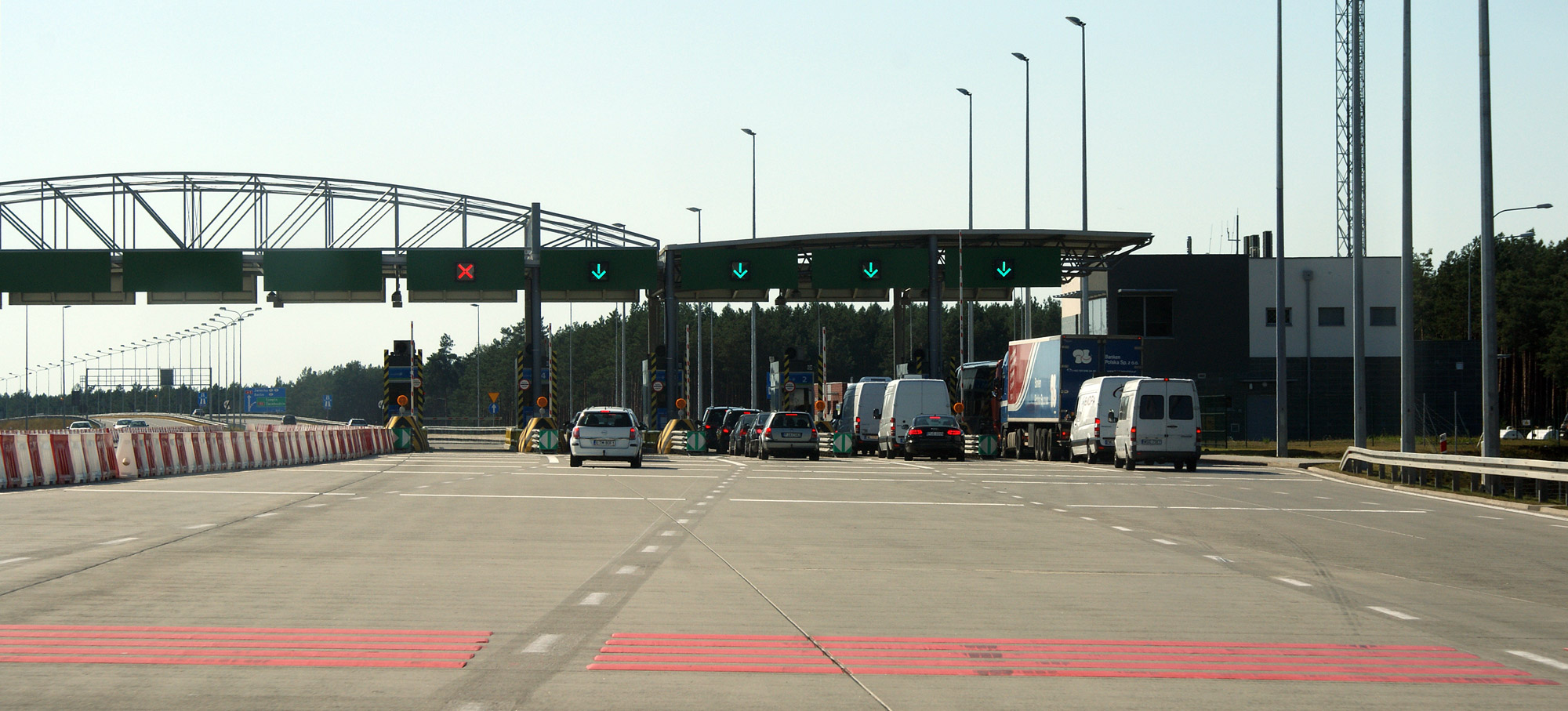
Tarnawa toll plaza

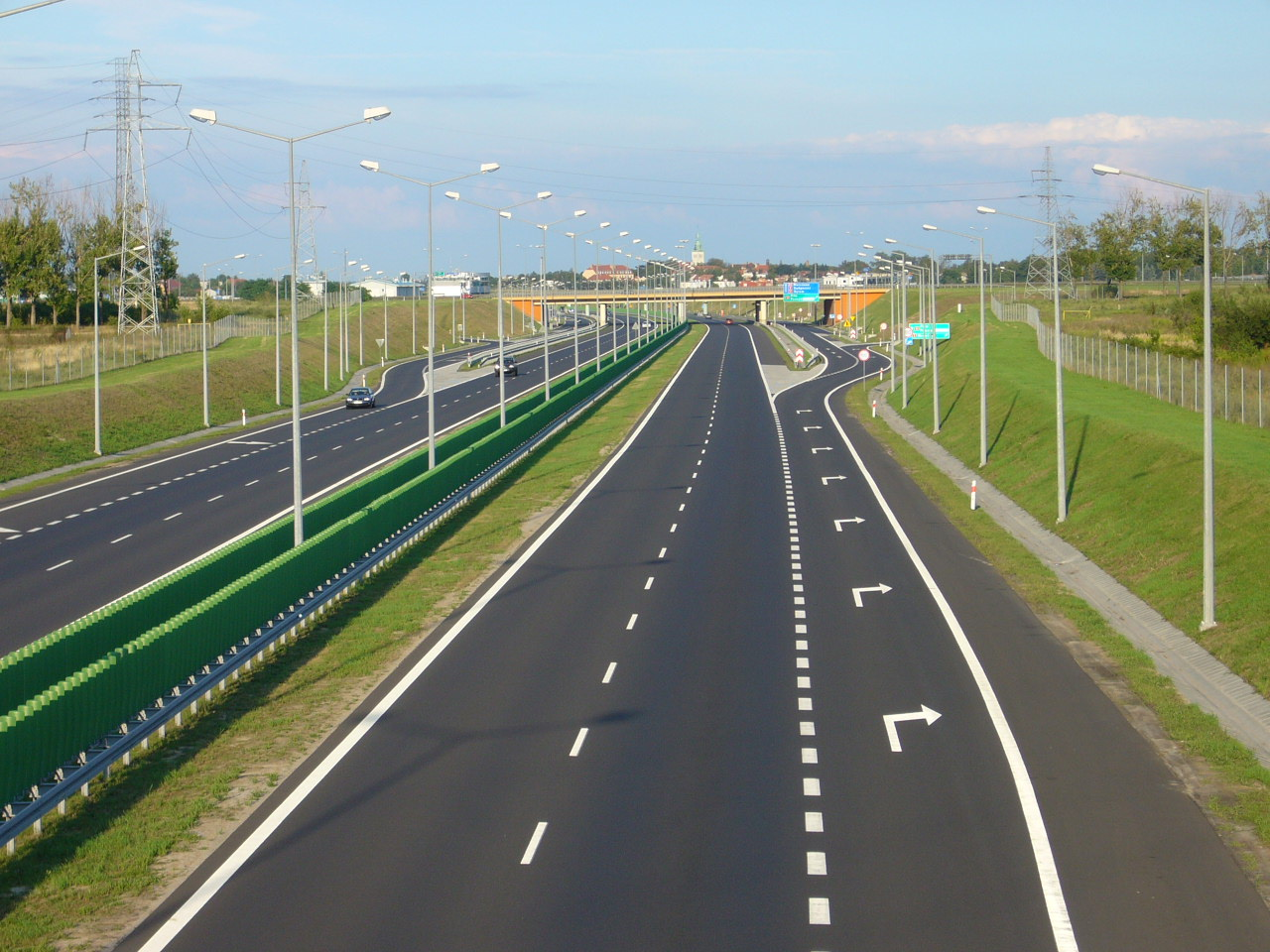
A2 near Poznań, opened in 2003. This picture shows the motorway before a six-lane expansion done in 2019

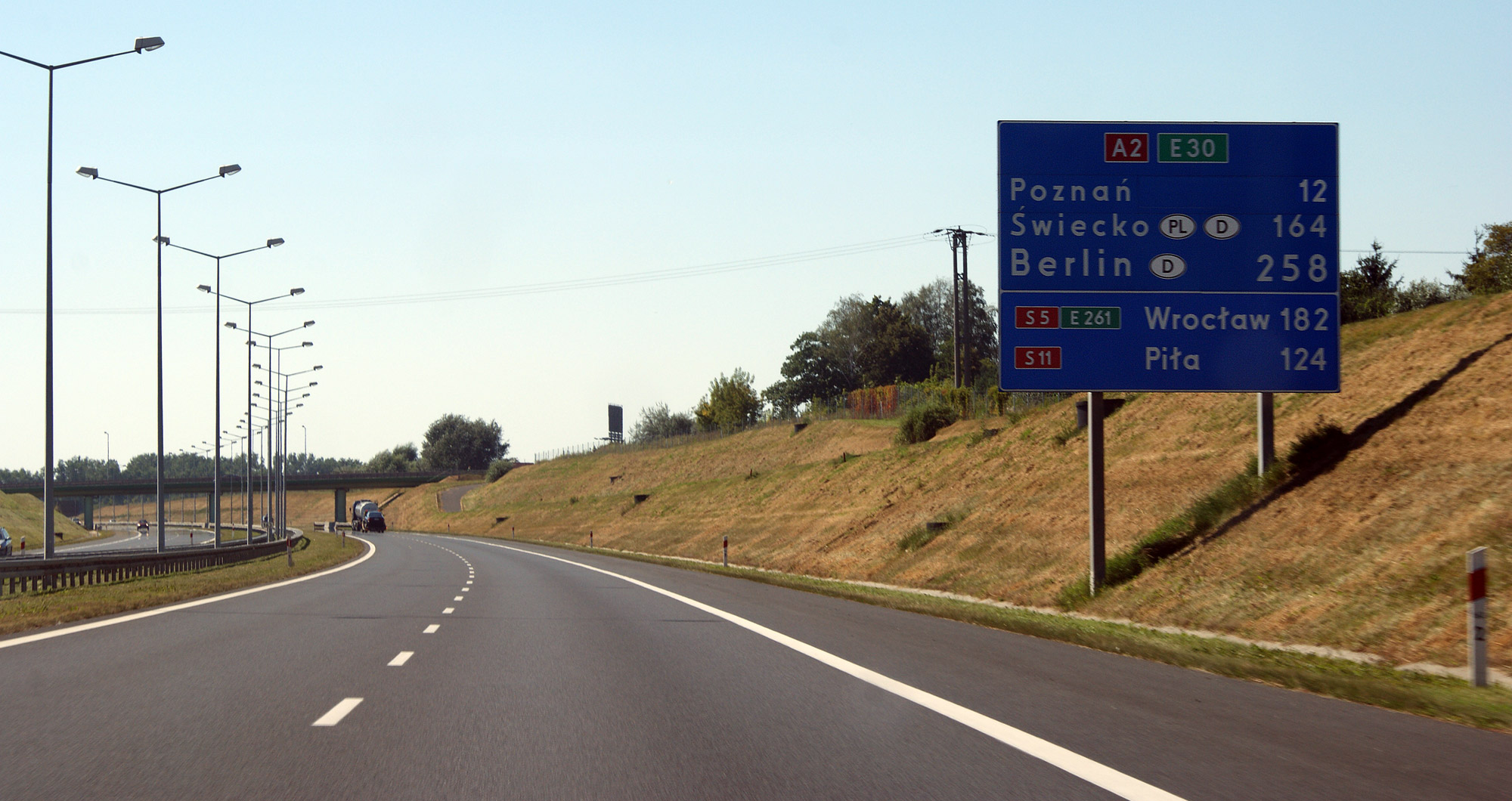
A2 near Poznań Komorniki interchange, before the six-lane expansion done in 2019

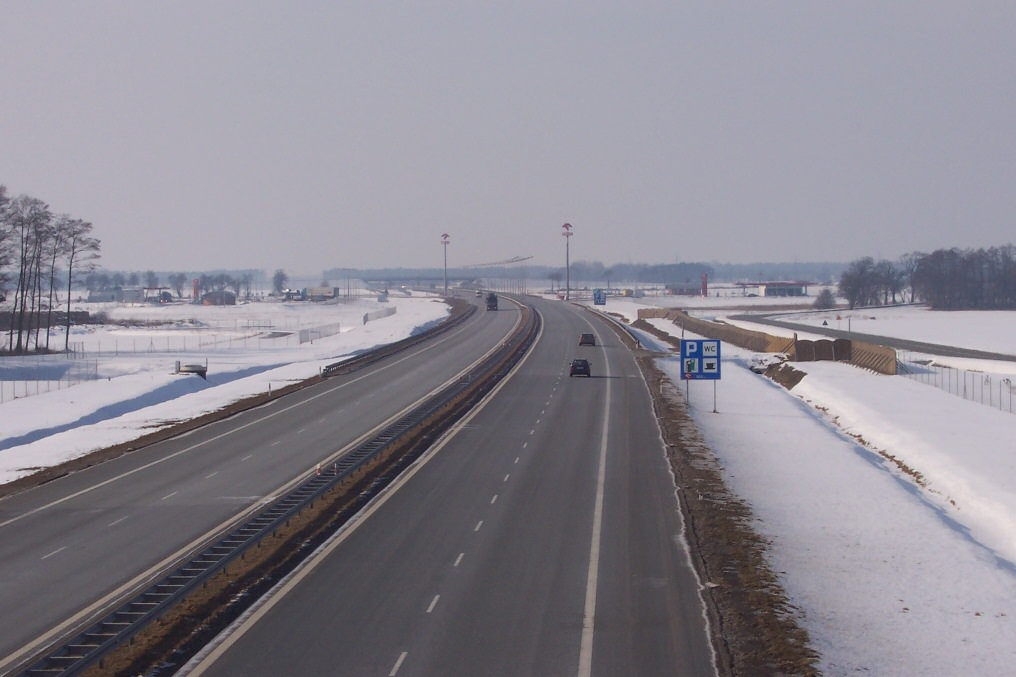
A2 near Kleszczewo (east of Poznań), opened in 2003.

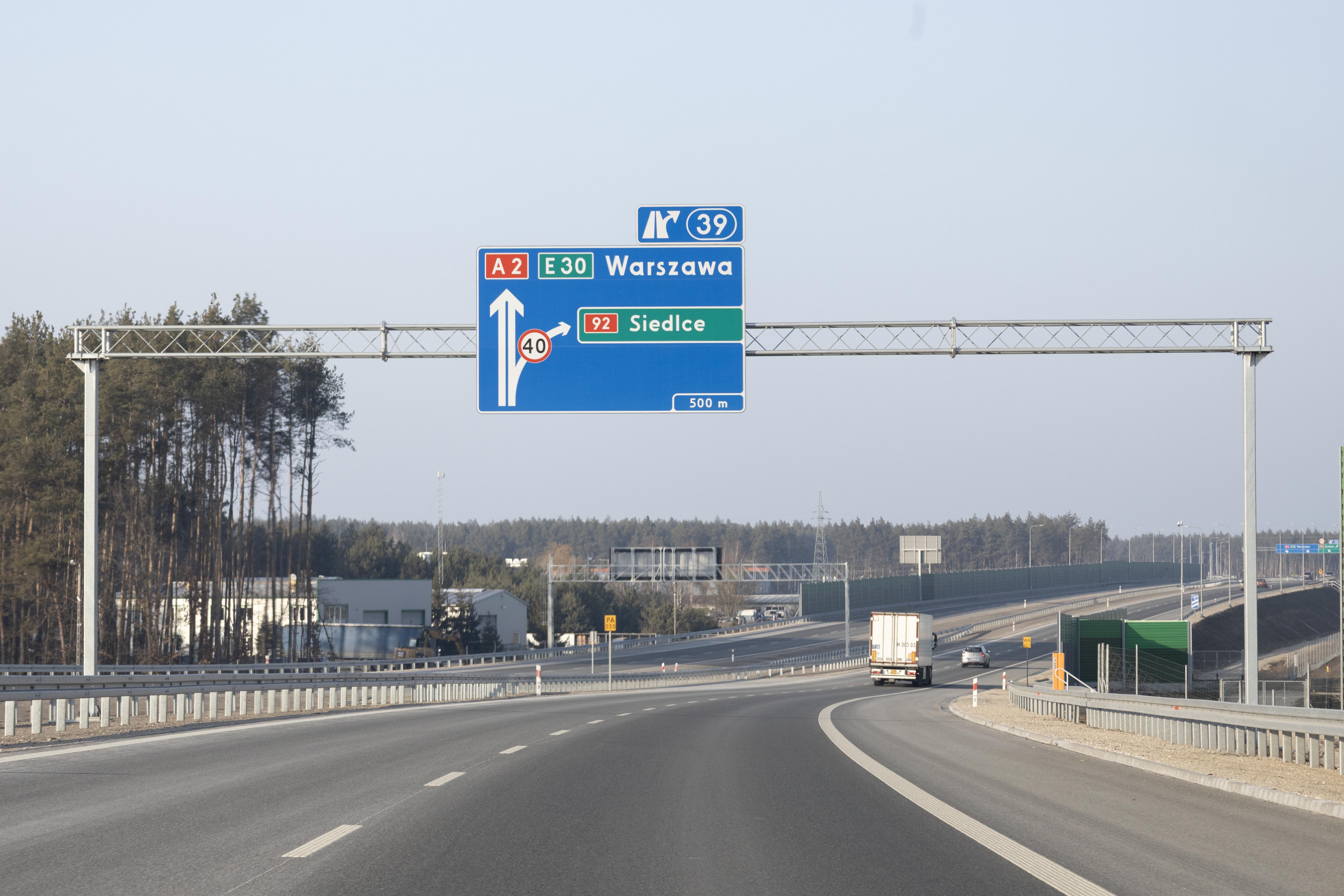
A2 near Siedlce Zachód interchange, opened in 2024.

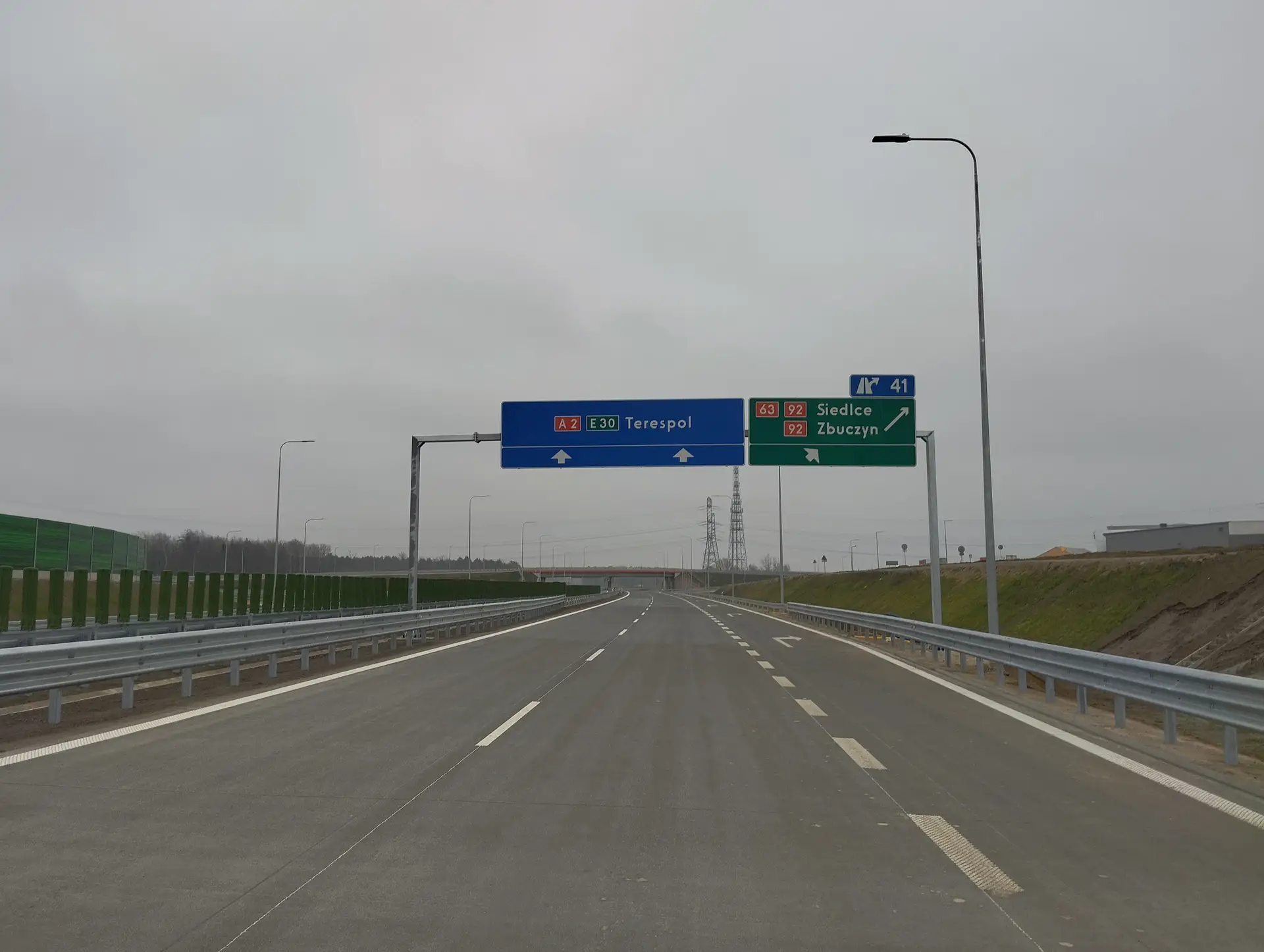
A2 near Siedlce Wschód interchange, opened in 2025.

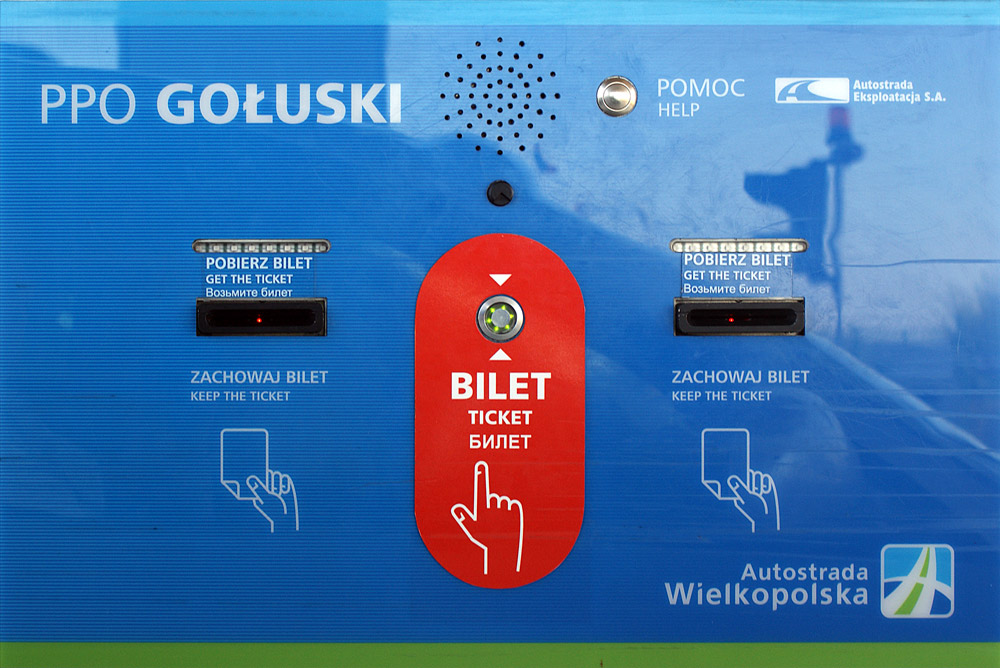
Ticket machine at Gołuski toll plaza

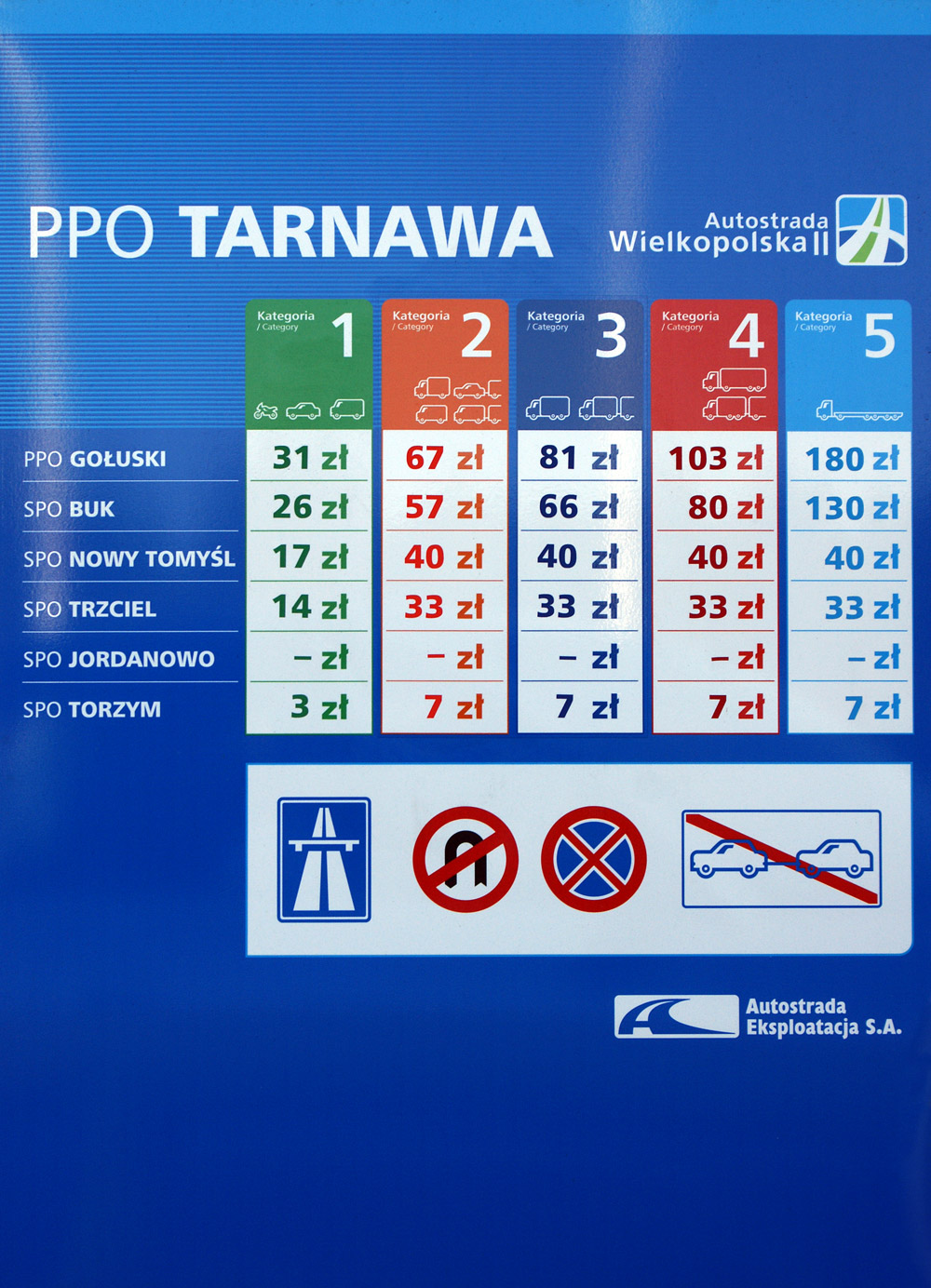
Toll price list (section Gołuski-Tarnawa; 2012)

The A2 motorway in Poland, officially named the Motorway of Freedom (Polish: Autostrada Wolności), is a motorway which runs from the Polish-German border (connecting to A12 autobahn near Świecko/Frankfurt an der Oder), through Poznań, Łódź and Warsaw to Biała Podlaska and, in the future, to the Polish-Belarusian border (connecting to M1 highway near Terespol/Brest). It is a part of European route E30.

The motorway between the German border and Warsaw (452 km (281 mi)) was constructed between 2001 and 2012 (the first fragment of length 48 km (30 mi) was originally built between 1977 and 1988 and renovated to modern standard during the construction of the remaining sections). The motorway does not technically reach the border with Germany as its endpoint is currently marked near the Świecko interchange ca. 4 km (2.5 mi) away from the border, although the remaining section is also a dual-carriageway road mostly up to the motorway standard; its reconstruction to full motorway standard is expected to start in 2027. Most of the stretch from the border to Konin is tolled (see Tolls).

A2 does not formally run through Warsaw itself, instead turning into expressway S2 (constructed between 2010 and 2021).

The motorway between Warsaw and Biała Podlaska (136 km (85 mi)) was constructed between 2018 and 2026 (its first segment, the bypass of Mińsk Mazowiecki, was opened in 2012). The section from Biała Podlaska to the Dobryń interchange (25 km (16 mi)) is under tender, expected to be finished by 2029. The motorway will terminate its cource at the Dobryń interchange, about 7 km (4.3 mi) away from the Belarusian border, where the traffic will get split into national road 2, national road 68 and a planned new road to the Małaszewicze Cargo Terminal.

== Route ==
Motorway section	Length	Construction dates	Notes
Świecko (PL/D border) – Nowy Tomyśl	105.9 km (65.8 mi)	2009 – 2011	opened 1 December 2011; toll motorway except for its westernmost fragment
Nowy Tomyśl – Poznań Zachód	46 km (29 mi)	2001 – 2004	opened 27 October 2004; toll motorway
Poznań bypass	26.1 km (16.2 mi)	2001 – 2003/2004	opened 13 September 2003 and 27 October 2004; widened to 2x3 lanes in 2019 and 2025
Poznań Wschód – Września	28.1 km (17.5 mi)	2001 – 2003	opened 27 November 2003; toll motorway
Września – Golina	34.2 km (21.3 mi)	1977 – 1985	opened 9 October 1985; reconstructed 2001–2002; toll motorway since 2002
Golina – Modła	13.8 km (8.6 mi)	1986 – 1988	opened 10 November 1988; reconstructed 2001–2002
Modła – Stryków	103 km (64 mi)	2004 – 2006	opened 26 July 2006
Stryków – Łódź Północ	1.7 km (1.1 mi)	2008	opened 22 December 2008; 2x3 lanes
Łódź Północ – Warsaw Konotopa	90.8 km (56.4 mi)	2010 – 2012	opened to traffic in May and June 2012, the last parts of it one day before the opening ceremony of UEFA Euro 2012; fully completed in the fall of 2012; planned widening to 2x3 lanes from Łódź to Pruszków and 2x4 lanes from Pruszków to Konotopa
Warsaw southern bypass	34.8 km (21.6 mi)	2010 – 2013; 2017 – 2021	Expressway
Warsaw Lubelska – Mińsk Mazowiecki	14.6 km (9.1 mi)	2018 – 2020	Opened on 14. August 2020, Lubelska interchange fully completely in 2021.
Mińsk Mazowiecki - Kałuszyn (Mińsk Mazowiecki bypass)	20.8 km (12.9 mi)	2009 – 2012	Opened 29 August 2012
Kałuszyn – Siedlce Południe	37.5 km (23.3 mi)	2021 – 2024	
Siedlce Południe – Siedlce Wschód	10 km (6.2 mi)	2023 – 2025	Opened 23 December 2025
Siedlce Wschód – Biała Podlaska	54.5 km (33.9 mi)	2023 – 2026	Opened April and June 2026
Biała Podlaska – Małaszewicze Cargo Terminal	25.5 km (15.8 mi)	2026 – 2029	Under tender.
Małaszewicze – Kukuryki (PL/BY border)	6.8 km (4.2 mi)	Cancelled	The planned construction of the new motorway route across the Polish-Belarusian border has been postponed in 2022 as a result of the Russian invasion of Ukraine and subsequently cancelled in 2026. The final terminus of the A2 motorway will be the Dobryń interchange, from where the traffic will get split into three non-motorway routes: national road 2 to the border terminal for private cars, national road 68 to the border terminal for freight traffic, and the planned new road to the Małaszewicze Cargo Terminal.

== History of construction ==
The first highway planned along part of this route was a Reichsautobahn initiated by Nazi Germany to connect Berlin with Poznań (Posen). The construction of this highway, accelerated after Poznań was incorporated into Germany following the Invasion of Poland in 1939, was interrupted by the war and never finished, but traces of its earthworks were clearly visible on satellite photographs for decades afterwards, especially between the border with Germany and Nowy Tomyśl. Most of these traces have now disappeared as the modern motorway was built largely following the same route. A short stretch of the uncompleted highway between the border and Rzepin was finished as a dual carriageway road after 1945, in effect forming an extension of the German A 12 highway (opened as a Reichsautobahn in the 1930s). Except for this stretch, the construction work was not continued in the decades after the war.

New plans to build the A2 motorway were seriously formulated in communist Poland in the 1970s, possibly with the goal of completing it in time for the Moscow Olympics in 1980. Because of the economic crisis which hit the country in the late 1970s and continued throughout the 1980s, only a 50 km (31 mi) section from Września to Konin was opened in the 1980s. Construction of another stretch (between Łódź and Warsaw) was started and then abandoned, leaving an interesting ruin informally named Olimpijka, which was in turn demolished around 2010 when building of the motorway resumed.

Intensive construction of the motorway started only in 2001 after the fall of communism in Poland in 1989. Out of the planned total length of 610 km (380 mi), 359 km (223 mi) have been completed. A section of about 150 km (93 mi) (Nowy Tomyśl – Poznań – Września – Konin) has been fully open since 2004. This section is a toll road, with the exception of a short stretch through Poznań which serves as that city's bypass (between the interchanges at Głuchowo and Kleszczewo). An additional 100 km (62 mi) section from Konin to Stryków near Łódź was opened on 26 July 2006. A short 4.8 km (3.0 mi) bypass of Stryków, consisting of a 2 km (1.2 mi) extension of the A2 and a provisional single carriageway section of the future A1 motorway, was opened in December 2008, to ease the heavy traffic in that town generated when the motorway reached it.

As of the winter of 2009/2010, the plan was to finish the whole section between the border with Germany and Warsaw by the spring of 2012, giving the Polish capital its first motorway connection to the European motorway network in time for the Euro 2012 football championships. That ambitious goal was jeopardized due to various difficulties encountered in finalizing the construction contracts and the delays that resulted. The 90 km (56 mi) section from Stryków to Warsaw was to be built in a public-private partnership, but the negotiations between the government and private companies interested in participating collapsed in February 2009 due to disputes over financing terms. It was then decided that this section of the motorway would be built using public funds alone. The new bidding process was started on 27 March, and the contracts for design and construction of the road were signed on 28 September. The section had been divided into 5 parts and so construction work began in 2010. The contractors were required to have the motorway open to traffic in time for Euro 2012. This goal was an ambitious one and ultimately proved challenging, given the possibility of unexpected delays during construction and the fact that the Chinese consortium abandoned the project less than a year later, so that new contractors had to be selected to replace it. The goal was to have this motorway stretch provisionally opened to traffic in time for Euro 2012, even if it is not fully completed, with various restrictions such as a lower speed limit to ensure safety. For a while it was not clear whether even this limited goal would be reached, but the motorway opened to traffic in June 2012 after very intensive construction work in the final few months.

In November 2011, construction of the stretch from the German border to Nowy Tomyśl had been completed. The road was opened to public traffic on 1 December. Toll plazas on this stretch of the highway weren't opened until May 2012 so use of the western section of the A2 was free of charge until then.

In May 2013, the interchange with the S3 (Jordanowo) was opened to traffic. First stretch is between the interchange with the A2 motorway and the Świebodzin North interchange. In June 2013, the S3 was extended further and opened to traffic to reach from the Świebodzin South interchange to the existing stretch of the S3 expressway at Sulechów. In July 2013, the elevated bypass of Świebodzin between the interchanges of Świebodzin North and Świebodzin South fully opened to traffic thus fully extending the S3 from Szczecin to Sulechów.

=== Guarantee scandal ===
After COVEC withdrew from completing its construction of the A2, Bank of China was to pay a performance guarantee to the Polish government's roads organization GDDKiA. However, with Export-Import Bank of China, they refused to pay this; only Deutsche Bank honored its obligations under the court decision.

== Plans ==
The eastern section from Warsaw to the border crossing with Belarus at Kukuryki near Brest (connecting with M1), about 170 km (110 mi) in length, is largely under construction. The decision finalizing the route of this section was announced in December 2011, the exception having been a short 21 km (13 mi) section of A2 forming the bypass of Mińsk Mazowiecki which was constructed between August 2009 and August 2012. The section between Warsaw and Mińsk Mazowiecki was opened in 2020. The longest section from Mińsk Mazowiecki to Biała Podlaska (101 km (63 mi)) is in realization (design-build contracts) and is planned to get completed by 2024. The last segment to the Belarusian border (32 km (20 mi)) is under design.

It is worth noting that the A2 motorway doesn't actually run through Warsaw, as the inhabitants of the districts through which it was to pass have successfully blocked its construction. This outcome was somewhat unusual, since the corridor for the motorway has been reserved by the city planners since the 1970s and kept free of construction. Instead, the traffic is rerouted through two express roads (S2 and S8), of lower standard than the originally planned motorway. One of these roads (S2) runs along the originally planned motorway corridor. In the most affected area, the district of Ursynów, the express road runs in a tunnel, built at considerable expense.

== Route description ==
Country	Voivodeship	Location	km	mi	Exit	Name	Destinations	Notes
Poland	Lubusz Voivodeship	Gmina Słubice	0	0.0	—	Former border crossing Świecko / Frankfurt	A 12 / E30 – Berlin	Formal endpoint, according to government plans of motorways and expressway network. Route continues as German motorway A 12 towards Berlin Kilometrage starting point Border crossing is no longer operational since 21 December 2007, due to Poland signing Schengen Agreement Western terminus of E30 overlap
Poland	Lubusz Voivodeship	Gmina Słubice	2.8	1.7	—	Świecko	DK 29 – Słubice / Zielona Góra, Urząd Celny Oddział Celny Świecko	Junction is a part of national road 2
Poland	Lubusz Voivodeship	Gmina Słubice	3.9	2.4	—			National road 2 becomes A2 motorway, according to the road signs
Poland	Lubusz Voivodeship	Gmina Słubice	5.1	3.2	Rest area	MOP Sosna	Sosna rest area	In direction to Poznań • Fuel station (Orlen) • parking • public toilets • EV charging station • bureau de change
Poland	Lubusz Voivodeship	Gmina Słubice	5.4	3.4	Rest area	MOP Gnilec	Gnilec rest area	In direction to Świecko • Fuel station (Orlen) • parking • public toilets • EV charging station • bureau de change
Poland	Lubusz Voivodeship	Rzepin	21.1	13.1	—	Rzepin	local road – Rzepin; DK 92 – Świebodzin, Poznań	
Poland	Lubusz Voivodeship	Tarnawa Rzepińska	22.7	14.1	—	Toll station Tarnawa	–	Western terminus of toll section
Poland	Lubusz Voivodeship	Torzym	35.1	21.8	—	Torzym	DW 138 – Torzym / Sulęcin	Junction equipped with toll station
Poland	Lubusz Voivodeship	Koryta, Lubusz Voivodeship	40.4	25.1	Parking area	MOP Koryta	Koryta parking area	In direction to Poznań • Parking • public toilets
Poland	Lubusz Voivodeship	Walewice, Lubusz Voivodeship	40.9	25.4	Parking area	MOP Walewice	Koryta parking area	In direction to Świecko • Parking • public toilets
Poland	Lubusz Voivodeship	Jordanowo, Lubusz Voivodeship	68.4	42.5	—	Jordanowo interchange	S 3 / E65 – Zielona Góra / Gorzów Wielkopolski	Interchange equipped with toll station, built as double-trumpet (see the scheme)
Poland	Lubusz Voivodeship	Rogoziniec	85.1	52.9	Rest area	MOP Rogoziniec	Rogoziniec rest area	In direction to Poznań • Fuel station (BP) • fast food restaurant (McDonald's) • parking • public toilets • bureau de change • automated teller machine
Poland	Lubusz Voivodeship	Chociszewo, Lubusz Voivodeship	85.7	53.3	Rest area	MOP Chociszewo	Chociszewo rest area	In direction to Poznań • Fuel station (BP) • fast food restaurant (McDonald's) • parking • public toilets • bureau de change • automated teller machine
Poland	Lubusz Voivodeship	Gmina Trzciel	91.7	57.0	—	Trzciel	local road – Trzciel / Zbąszyń	Junction equipped with toll station
Poland	Greater Poland Voivodeship	Gmina Miedzichowo	108	67	—	Nowy Tomyśl	DW 305 – Nowy Tomyśl; DK 92 – Pniewy	Junction equipped with toll station Access to national road 92 via voivodeship road 305
Poland	Greater Poland Voivodeship	Kozie Laski	113.9	70.8	Parking area	MOP Kozielaski	Kozielaski parking area	In direction to Poznań • Parking • public toilets • playground • picnic tables
Poland	Greater Poland Voivodeship	Wytomyśl	114.3	71.0	Parking area	MOP Wytomyśl	Wytomyśl parking area	In direction to Świecko • Parking • public toilets • playground • picnic tables
Poland	Greater Poland Voivodeship	Zalesie, Szamotuły County	133.7	83.1	Rest area	MOP Zalesie	Zalesie rest area	In direction to Poznań • Fuel station (Orlen) • restaurant • parking • public toilets • EV charging station • playground • picnic tables
Poland	Greater Poland Voivodeship	Sędzinko	134	83	Rest area	MOP Sędzinko	Sędzinko rest area	In direction to Świecko • Fuel station (Orlen) • car wash • parking • public toilets • EV charging station • playground • picnic tables
Poland	Greater Poland Voivodeship	Niepruszewo	140	87	—	Buk	DW 307 – Poznań-Ławica Airport / Buk	Junction equipped with toll station
Poland	Greater Poland Voivodeship	Konarzewo, Poznań County	150.9	93.8	Parking area	MOP Konarzewo	Konarzewo parking area	In direction to Poznań • Parking • public toilets • playground • picnic tables
Poland	Greater Poland Voivodeship	Dopiewiec	151.2	94.0	Parking area	MOP Dopiewiec	Dopiewiec parking area	In direction to Świecko • Parking • public toilets • playground • picnic tables
Poland	Greater Poland Voivodeship	Konarzewo, Poznań County	152.2	94.6	—	Toll station Gołuski	–	Eastern terminus of toll section
Poland	Greater Poland Voivodeship	Głuchowo, Poznań County	154.7	96.1	—	Poznań Zachód interchange	S 5 / E261 – Wrocław S 11 – Piła, Poznań-Ławica Airport	Double-trumpet interchange (usually highly congested, see the scheme); Western end of concurrency with expressways S5 and S11 and European route E261 Western endpoint of the stretch with three lanes per carriageway
Poland	Greater Poland Voivodeship	Poznań	159.4	99.0	—	Poznań Komorniki interchange	DW 196 – Poznań-Targi; DW 311 – Komorniki, Stęszew	Cloverleaf interchange with collector-distributor roads (see the scheme) Voivodeship roads are unsigned
Poland	Greater Poland Voivodeship	Poznań	164	102	—	Poznań Luboń	DW 430 – Poznań-Centrum / Luboń, Mosina	Centrum means city center see the scheme
Poland	Greater Poland Voivodeship	Poznań	165	103	—	Lucjana Ballenstedta Bridge	—	Bridge over Warta river
Poland	Greater Poland Voivodeship	Poznań	170.6	106.0	—	Poznań Krzesiny interchange	DW 433 – Poznań-Centrum, Targi S 11 – Katowice	Cloverleaf interchange with collector-distributor roads (see the scheme) Centrum means center Voivodeship road 433 is unsigned End of concurrency with expressway S11 Eastern endpoint of the stretch with three lanes per carriageway
Poland	Greater Poland Voivodeship	Tulce	177.1	110.0	Rest area	MOP Krzyżowniki	Krzyżowniki rest area	In direction to Konin • Fuel station (Orlen) • cafe • parking • EV charging station • public toilets • picnic tables • automated teller machine
Poland	Greater Poland Voivodeship	Tulce	177.4	110.2	Rest area	MOP Tulce	Tulce rest area	In direction to Poznań • Fuel station (Orlen) • restaurant • parking • EV charging station • public toilets • picnic tables • bureau de change
Poland	Greater Poland Voivodeship	Krzyżowniki, Poznań County	180	110	—	Poznań Wschód interchange	S 5 / E261 – Bydgoszcz	Eastern end of concurrency with expressway S5 and European route E261 Trumpet interchange
Poland	Greater Poland Voivodeship	Krzyżowniki, Poznań County	181.7	112.9	—	Toll station Nagradowice	–	Western terminus of toll section
Poland	Greater Poland Voivodeship	Gmina Nekla	199.9	124.2	Parking area	MOP Targowa Górka	Targowa Górka parking area	In direction to Konin • Parking • public toilets
Poland	Greater Poland Voivodeship	Gmina Nekla	200.4	124.5	Parking area	MOP Chwałszyce	Chwałszyce parking area	In direction to Poznań • Parking • public toilets • playground
Poland	Greater Poland Voivodeship	Gmina Września	208	129	—	Września	DK 15 – Gniezno / Jarocin; DK 92 – Poznań / Września	Toll junction, not equipped with toll station Trumpet interchange Access to national road 15 via national road 92 in direction to Września
Poland	Greater Poland Voivodeship	Września	213.2– 215.6	132.5– 134.0	—		–	Former highway strip Września
Poland	Greater Poland Voivodeship	Gozdowo, Greater Poland Voivodeship	216.3	134.4	Rest area	MOP Gozdowo	Gozdowo rest area	In direction to Konin • Fuel station (BP) • fast food restaurant (KFC) • parking • public toilets • playground • picnic tables • automated teller machine
Poland	Greater Poland Voivodeship	Gozdowo, Greater Poland Voivodeship	216.7	134.7	Rest area	MOP Sołeczno	Sołeczno rest area	In direction to Poznań • Fuel station (BP) • fast food restaurant (KFC) • parking • public toilets • picnic tables
Poland	Greater Poland Voivodeship	Gmina Strzałkowo	226.6	140.8	Parking area	MOP Skarboszewo	Skarboszewo parking area	In direction to Poznań • Parking • public toilets • picnic tables
Poland	Greater Poland Voivodeship	Wierzbocice	228.5– 229.4	142.0– 142.5	—	Słupca	DW 466 – Słupca / Pyzdry	Junction partially equipped with toll station – see the scheme
Poland	Greater Poland Voivodeship	Gmina Lądek	236.9	147.2	Parking area	MOP Lądek	Lądek parking area	In direction to Konin • Parking • public toilets
Poland	Greater Poland Voivodeship	Gmina Lądek	238.6	148.3	—	Toll station Lądek	–	
Poland	Greater Poland Voivodeship	Sługocin	243.7	151.4	—	Sługocin	DW 467 – Golina / Pyzdry	Toll junction, not equipped with toll station
Poland	Greater Poland Voivodeship	Konin County	245.8– 246.1	152.7– 152.9	—	Bridge	—	Bridge over Warta river
Poland	Greater Poland Voivodeship	Gmina Rzgów, Greater Poland Voivodeship	216.3	134.4	Rest area	MOP Osiecza	Osiecza rest area	In direction to Konin • Fuel station (Orlen) • restaurant • hotel • parking • public toilets • car wash • EV charging station • automated teller machine
Poland	Greater Poland Voivodeship	Gmina Rzgów, Greater Poland Voivodeship	251.5	156.3	Rest area	MOP Osiecza	Osiecza rest area	In direction to Poznań • Fuel station (Orlen) • restaurant • parking • public toilets • picnic tables • automated teller machine
Poland	Greater Poland Voivodeship	Modła Królewska	257.2	159.8	—	Modła interchange	DK 25 – Konin / Kalisz	Cloverleaf interchange with collector-distributor roads (see the scheme) Eastern terminus of toll section
Poland	Greater Poland Voivodeship	Gmina Stare Miasto	261.4	162.4	—	Konin Wschód	DK 72 – Konin / Turek	Trumpet interchange
Poland	Greater Poland Voivodeship	Gmina Stare Miasto	262.3	163.0	—	Toll station Żdżary	–	Disused toll station, western terminus of free-flow toll section Speed limit: 50 kilometres per hour (31 mph)
Poland	Greater Poland Voivodeship	Olesin, Turek County	274.8	170.8	Parking area	MOP Leonia	Leonia parking area	In direction to Stryków • Parking • public toilets • picnic tables • playground
Poland	Greater Poland Voivodeship	Olesin, Turek County	275.2	171.0	Parking area	MOP Kuny	Kuny parking area	In direction to Konin • Parking • public toilets • picnic tables
Poland	Greater Poland Voivodeship	Gmina Kościelec	285.5	177.4	—	Koło	DW 470 – Koło / Turek	Toll junction (trumpet) with disused toll station Access to voivodeship road 470 via a local road in direction to Turek
Poland	Greater Poland Voivodeship	Police Mostowe	287.3	178.5	Rest area	MOP Łęka	Łęka rest area	In direction to Stryków • Fuel station (LOTOS) • fast-food restaurants (McDonald's, Subway) • parking • public toilets • picnic tables • automated teller machine Connected with MOP Police by a footbridge
Poland	Greater Poland Voivodeship	Police Mostowe	287.6	178.7	Rest area	MOP Police	Police rest area	In direction to Konin • Fuel station (LOTOS) • fast-food restaurants (McDonald's, Subway) • motel • parking • public toilets • picnic tables • automated teller machine • playground Connected with MOP Łęka by a footbridge
Poland	Greater Poland Voivodeship	Gmina Dąbie, Greater Poland Voivodeship	291.3	181.0	—	Bridge	—	Bridge over Warta river
Poland	Greater Poland Voivodeship	Gmina Dąbie, Greater Poland Voivodeship	297.7	185.0	Parking area	MOP Cichmiana	Cichmiana rest area	In direction to Stryków • Parking • public toilets • picnic tables • playground
Poland	Greater Poland Voivodeship	Gmina Dąbie, Greater Poland Voivodeship	298	185	Parking area	MOP Sobótka	Sobótka rest area	In direction to Konin • Parking • public toilets • picnic tables
Poland	Greater Poland Voivodeship	Gmina Dąbie, Greater Poland Voivodeship	302.1	187.7	—	Dąbie	DW 473 – Dąbie / Uniejów	Toll junction (trumpet) with disused toll station Junction on the border of Greater Poland and Łódź Voivodeships
Poland	Łódź Voivodeship	Gmina Uniejów	307.8	191.3	Parking area	MOP Zaborów	Zaborów parking area	In direction to Stryków • Parking • public toilets • picnic tables
Poland	Łódź Voivodeship	Gmina Uniejów	308.3	191.6	Parking area	MOP Kozanki	Kozanki parking area	In direction to Konin • Parking • public toilets • picnic tables • playground
Poland	Łódź Voivodeship	Gmina Wartkowice	318.7	198.0	—	Bridge	—	Bridge over Ner river
Poland	Łódź Voivodeship	Wola Niedźwiedzia	320	200	—	Wartkowice	DW 703 – Łęczyca / Poddębice	Toll junction (trumpet) with disused toll station
Poland	Łódź Voivodeship	Stary Chrząstów	330.9	205.6	Rest area	MOP Chrząstów Południe	Chrząstów Południe rest area	In direction to Stryków • Fuel station (Orlen) • fast-food restaurant (Burger King) • motel • parking • public toilets • picnic tables • automated teller machine
Poland	Łódź Voivodeship	Stary Chrząstów	331.3	205.9	Rest area	MOP Chrząstów Północ	Chrząstów Północ rest area	In direction to Konin • Fuel station (Orlen) • fast-food restaurant (KFC) • parking • public toilets • picnic tables • automated teller machine (Euronet) • playground
Poland	Łódź Voivodeship	Emilia, Łódź Voivodeship	343.4	213.4	—	Emilia	DK 91 – Włocławek / Łódź, Airport	Toll junction (trumpet) with disused toll station Junction under reconstruction due to the construction of expressway S14
Poland	Łódź Voivodeship	Gmina Zgierz	347.1	215.7	Parking area	MOP Ciosny	Ciosny parking area	In direction to Warsaw • Parking • public toilets
Poland	Łódź Voivodeship	Gmina Zgierz	347.4	215.9	Parking area	MOP Ciosny	Ciosny parking area	In direction to Poznań • Parking • public toilets • picnic tables
Poland	Łódź Voivodeship	Gmina Zgierz	349.7	217.3	—	Zgierz	DW 702 – Kutno / Zgierz	Toll junction (trumpet) with disused toll station
Poland	Łódź Voivodeship	Gmina Stryków	358.3	222.6	—	Toll station Stryków	–	Disused toll station, eastern terminus of free-flow toll section Speed limit: 50 kilometres per hour (31 mph)
Poland	Łódź Voivodeship	Sosnowiec, Zgierz County	360.3	223.9	—	Stryków	DK 14 – Łódź, Airport / Łowicz DK 71 – Zgierz DW 708 – Brzeziny	Trumpet junction
Poland	Łódź Voivodeship	Stryków	363.6	225.9	—	Łódź Północ interchange	A 1 / E75 – Gdańsk / Katowice, Łódź S 8 / E67 – Wrocław	Access to expressway S8 via motorway A1 in direction to Łódź and Katowice
Poland	Łódź Voivodeship	Nowostawy Dolne	368.4	228.9	Rest area	MOP Niesułków	Niesułków rest area	In direction to Warsaw • Fuel station (Shell) • fast-food restaurant (Burger King) • restaurant • parking • public toilets • automated teller machine • laundromat Connected with MOP Nowostawy by a footbridge
Poland	Łódź Voivodeship	Nowostawy Dolne	368.9	229.2	Rest area	MOP Nowostawy	Nowostawy rest area	In direction to Stryków • Fuel station (Shell) • fast-food restaurant (Burger King) • restaurant • hotel • parking • public toilets • automated teller machine • laundromat Connected with MOP Niesułków by a footbridge
Poland	Łódź Voivodeship	Łyszkowice, Łowicz County	385.3	239.4	—	Łyszkowice	DW 704 – Łowicz / Brzeziny	Trumpet junction
Poland	Łódź Voivodeship	Polesie, Łowicz County	393.7	244.6	Rest area	MOP Polesie	Niesułków rest area	In direction to Warsaw • Fuel station (BP) • fast-food restaurant (McDonald's) • parking • public toilets • automated teller machine
Poland	Łódź Voivodeship	Polesie, Łowicz County	394.2	244.9	Rest area	MOP Parma	Parma rest area	In direction to Stryków • Fuel station (BP) • fast-food restaurant (McDonald's) • restaurant • parking • public toilets • picnic tables • automated teller machine
Poland	Łódź Voivodeship	Dzierzgów, Łódź Voivodeship	397.7	247.1	—	Skierniewice	DK 70 – Łowicz / Skierniewice	Trumpet junction
Poland	Łódź Voivodeship	Gmina Bolimów	410.8	255.3	Parking area	MOP Mogiły	Mogiły parking area	In direction to Warsaw • Parking • public toilets
Poland	Łódź Voivodeship	Gmina Bolimów	411.1	255.4	Parking area	MOP Bolimów	Bolimów parking area	In direction to Stryków • Parking • public toilets
Poland	Mazovian Voivodeship	Wiskitki	419.6	260.7	—	Wiskitki	DK 50 – Sochaczew / Żyrardów, Grójec	Trumpet junction National road 50 is part of Warsaw transit bypass (mainly for HGVs)
Poland	Mazovian Voivodeship	Holendry Baranowskie	427	265	Rest area	MOP Baranów Południe	Baranów Południe rest area	In direction to Warsaw • Fuel station (Orlen) • fast-food restaurant (KFC) • parking • public toilets • automated teller machine Connected with MOP Baranów Północ by a footbridge (bicycles allowed)
Poland	Mazovian Voivodeship	Baranów, Grodzisk Mazowiecki County	427.7	265.8	Rest area	MOP Baranów Północ	Baranów rest area	In direction to Stryków • Fuel station (Orlen) • fast-food restaurant (KFC) • EV charging station • parking • public toilets • playground Connected with MOP Baranów Północ by a footbridge (bicycles allowed)
Poland	Mazovian Voivodeship	Tłuste	438.6	272.5	—	Grodzisk Mazowiecki	DW 579 – Grodzisk Mazowiecki / Błonie	Trumpet junction
Poland	Mazovian Voivodeship	Kotowice	443.2	275.4	Rest area	MOP Brwinów Południe	Brwinów Południe rest area	In direction to Warsaw • Fuel station (LOTOS) • fast-food restaurant (McDonald's) • EV charging station • parking • public toilets Connected with MOP Brwinów Północ by a footbridge Site of the Oak of Freedom (Polish: Dąb Wolności), planted together by presidents of Poland and Germany
Poland	Mazovian Voivodeship	Baranów, Grodzisk Mazowiecki County	427.7	265.8	Rest area	MOP Baranów Północ	Baranów rest area	In direction to Stryków • Fuel station (Orlen) • fast-food restaurant (KFC) • EV charging station • parking • public toilets • playground Connected with MOP Baranów Północ by a footbridge
Poland	Mazovian Voivodeship	Koszajec	446.5	277.4	—		–	Site of the dismantled unfinished toll station Pruszków
Poland	Mazovian Voivodeship	Pruszków	449.9	279.6	—	Bridge	–	Bridge over Utrata river
Poland	Mazovian Voivodeship	Pruszków	450.9	280.2	—	Pruszków	DW 718 – Pruszków / Borzęcin Duży	
Poland	Mazovian Voivodeship	Pruszków	452.4	281.1	—			Transition from motorway to the expressway on the eastbound carriageway, according to the road signs Speed limit on the carriageway: 120 kilometres per hour (75 mph)
Poland	Mazovian Voivodeship	Gmina Ożarów Mazowiecki	455.6	283.1	—	Konotopa interchange	S 2 / E30 – Warsaw-Ursynów, Chopin Airport, Terespol S 7 / E77 – Gdańsk / Kraków S 8 / E67 – Wrocław / Warsaw-Centrum, Praga Północ, Białystok	Road continues as the expressway S2 – southern bypass of Warsaw (Polish: Południowa Obwodnica Warszawy) Kilometrage continues on expressway S2
Poland	Mazovian Voivodeship	Izabela, Masovian Voivodeship	490.7	304.9	33			East end of S2 road designation, expressway continues as motorway A2 Kilometrage continues from expressway S2
Poland	Mazovian Voivodeship	Stary Konik	495.5	307.9	34	Halinów	DK 92 – Sulejówek, Warsaw / Dębe Wielkie	Cloverleaf junction with collector-distributor roads Exit number as part of "experimental signage"
Poland	Mazovian Voivodeship	Gmina Dębe Wielkie	502.6	312.3	Parking area	MOP Ostrów-Kania	Ostrów-Kania parking area	In direction to Siedlce • Parking • public toilets • picnic tables • playground • Fuel station (BP)
Poland	Mazovian Voivodeship	Gmina Dębe Wielkie	503.2	312.7	Parking area	MOP Ostrów-Kania	Ostrów-Kania parking area	In direction to Warsaw • Parking • public toilets • picnic tables • playground • Fuel station (BP) • restaurant
Poland	Mazovian Voivodeship	Arynów	507.8	315.5	—	Mińsk Mazowiecki	DK 50 – Ostrów Mazowiecka / Grójec	Trumpet junction National road 50 is part of Warsaw transit bypass (mainly for HGVs)
Poland	Mazovian Voivodeship	Gmina Jakubów	515.9– 516.6	320.6– 321.0	—	Jakubów	local road – Jakubów / Stara Niedziałka	
Poland	Mazovian Voivodeship	Gmina Jakubów	520.9	323.7	Parking area	MOP Jędrzejów	Jędrzejów parking area	In direction to Siedlce Signed as parking only • Parking • public toilets • picnic tables Connected with MOP Moczydła by a footbridge
Poland	Mazovian Voivodeship	Gmina Jakubów	521.5	324.0	Parking area	MOP Moczydła	Moczydła parking area	In direction to Warsaw • Parking • public toilets • picnic tables
Poland	Mazovian Voivodeship	Ryczołek	525.2	326.3	37	Kałuszyn	DK 92	Trumpet junction
Poland	Mazovian Voivodeship	Stare Groszki	533.9	331.8	38	Groszki	DK 92	Trumpet junction
Poland	Mazovian Voivodeship	Gręzów	553.7	344.1	39	Siedlce Zachód	DK 92	Trumpet junction
Poland	Mazovian Voivodeship	Żelków-Kolonia	560.8	348.5	40	Siedlce Południe	DK 92	Trumpet junction
Poland	Mazovian Voivodeship	Gmina Zbuczyn	570.5	354.5	41	Siedlce Wschód	DK 2 / E30 – Terespol; DK 92 – Siedlce	Trumpet junction
Poland	Lublin Voivodeship	Łukowisko			—	Łukowisko	S 19	Double-trumpet junction, planned
Poland	Lublin Voivodeship	Cicibór Duży			—	Biała Podlaska	DW 811	Trumpet junction, planned
Poland	Lublin Voivodeship	Dobryń Duży			—	Dobryń	DK 68	The last junction before country border, planned
Poland	Lublin Voivodeship	Kukuryki			—	Kukuryki / Kazłovičy border crossing Belarus–Poland border	M 1 / E30 – Brest, Minsk	Eastern terminus of motorway according to government plans Currently the terminus of national road 68 Road will continue as Belarusian magistral route M1 Eastern terminus of European route E30 overlap
Poland	1.000 mi = 1.609 km; 1.000 km = 0.621 mi: Closed/former; Concurrency terminus; Proposed; Tolled; Route transition; Unopened							

== See also ==
- Highways in Poland
- European route E30
