= Modliszewski family with Ostoja coat of arms =

Ostoja coat of arms

Polish medieval CoA Ostoja

The Modliszewski family - a Polish noble family with the Ostoja coat of arms, belonging to the heraldic Clan Ostoja (Moscics). The Modliszewski took their surname from the village of Modliszewo Kościelne (sometimes Modliszewo Cyrkiewne, Modliszewo Lesser, Modliszewo Małe or Modliszewko, just like today), located in the former district of Gniezno in the Kalisz voivodeship. Modliszewo Kościelne bordered with Modliszewem Wielkim, from which the Modliszewskis of the Dryja coat of arms (they were of common origin with the Mileski family from Mileszyn) and the Modliszewskis of the Topór coat of arms (who were a branch of the Kołybskis from Kołybek). The Modliszewskis of the Ostoja coat of arms were mentioned by Kasper Niesiecki in Polish Herbarz.

== Family surname ==
The surname of the Modliszewski family of the Ostoja CoA is the nickname of Sitek, Sitko, Sittko, Sythek. According to prof. W. Dworzaczek in Modliszewo Kościelny was also inherited by the Modliszewskis who used the surname of Sobiejuch of an unknown coat of arms.

== The oldest source certificates concerning the family ==
Listed below are selected source testimonials concerning the Modliszewski of the Ostoja CoA and the nest village of Modliszewo Kościelny until the beginning of the 16th century.

- The oldest mention of Modliszewo (Modliszewka) comes from a document by prince Władysław, issued in 1316, in which Andreas de Modlizevo is mentioned.
- There was a church in Modliszewo (Modliszewko) already in the second half of the 14th century. In 1380, the Gniezno official settled the dispute between Maciej, the parish priest from Modliszew Mały, and the heirs of Modliszewko Wielki.
- In the years 1395–1401, Piechno of Modliszewo, castellan of Czarnków, performed. His spouse was Małgorzata. According to prof. W. Dworzaczek may have belonged to the Ostoje family.
- In 1401, the Gniezno official testified that Paweł from Jabłkowo, the parish priest in Modliszewo, cleared the charge of raping Magda of Modliszewo.
- In 1414, Jan, the parson of Modliszewo, appeared as a witness in the tithing case in Mieleszyn.
- In 1434, Marcin, the parish priest in Modliszewo, was accused of having illegally taken over a two-year tithe worth 3 fines from Jan Giemza's department in Mielno.
- In 1448, Jan, Mikołaj, Piotr and Wojciech, brothers from Modliszewo, had a date from Marcin of Mielno. Marcin and Mikołaj, sons of the deceased Wojciech, performed in 1449. Marcin, Mikołaj, Piotr, Wojciech, brothers from Modliszewo, had a term around 1450 on the part of Dorota, the wife of Andrzej of Wilamowo.
- The first Modliszewski who can be associated with the heraldic Clan Ostoja, was Marcin Sitek, heir in Lesser Modliszewo, who in 1451 framed his wife Małgorzata in the amount of 40 fines on half of his parts in this village. Between him and Marcin of Wielki Modliszew, Dryja coat of arms, in 1461 a bid bond was established that they would live in peace.
- In 1464, Fr. Mikołaj Modliszewski, parish priest in Izdebno, squire in Mały Modliszewo, for his part in this village sold 3 wages of annual rent for 11 fines of Fr. Paul, the parish priest of the Church of St. Peter in Gniezno.
- In 1476, Stanisław of Modliszewo, chamberlain of Inowrocław, and his brother Bartłomiej performed. This year, they replaced an empty field in the village of Knieja with the village of Wolice and a lake called Słupy. According to prof. W. Dworzaczek may have come from Modliszew Kościelny.
- In 1478, Wojciech Sitek of Modliszew Kościelny, in the half of his part of this village, framed a dowry to his wife Małgorzata Mielińska, Marcin's daughter, in the amount of 70 fines. The same, in 1481, half of his part in Modliszewo Kościelny, framed a dowry in the amount of 50 fines to his second wife, Anna of Kołaty.
- In 1526, there appeared Jan Modliszewski of Prochów, the parish priest in Modliszewko and Łąkoszyn (near Kutno), and the regular canon in Trzemeszno.

== The estates belonging to the family ==
Listed below are the most important lands belonging to the Modliszewski of the Ostoja CoA.

Modliszewo Kościelne (like Modliszewko), Wierzejcze (like Wierzejewice), Dębłowo, Wierzbocice,

== Family representatives ==
- Marcin Sitek of Modliszewo (died after 1468) - heir in Kościelny (Lesser) Modliszewo. Married to Małgorzata.
- Stanisław of Modliszew (died after 1476) - chamberlain of Inowrocław, owner of the estates in Knieja and Wolice. According to prof. W. Dworzaczek most likely came from Modliszew Kościelny and could have belonged to the Clan Ostoja.
- Wojciech Sitek of Modliszewo (died after 1481) - heir in Modliszewo Kościelny. Married twice. His first wife was Małgorzata Mielińska and the second was Anna from Kołat Kołacka.
- Mikołaj of Modliszew Modliszewski (died after 1491) - Catholic priest, parish priest in Izdebno and Raczków, heir in Modliszewo Kościelny. In 1491, he sold his parts in Modliszew Kościelny to his nephews, Wawrzyniec and Mikołaj Modliszewski, for 40 fines, keeping for himself one fine of the annual rent from this village.
- Wawrzyniec Modliszewo Modliszewski (died before 1501) - heir in Modliszewo Kościelny. He was the son of Marcin and Małgorzata Modliszewski. His wife was Jadwiga.
- Wojciech Modliszewski (died before 1503) - heir of the estates in Modliszewo Kościelny, courtier of king Aleksander Jagiellończyk. His father was Wojciech Sitek Modliszewski, and his mother was Małgorzata Mielińska. He was murdered in the town of Łubów by Mikołaj and Bartosz Chwałkowski. He had a brother Łukasz and two half-sisters - Małgorzata and Katarzyna, a Poor Clare in Gniezno.
- Mikołaj Sitek of Modliszew Wierzejski (died before 1512) - heir in Modliszewo Kościelny, owner of a part of the village of Wierzejcze (today Wierzejewice). Son of Marcin and Małgorzata Modliszewski. His first wife was Jadwiga Piątkowska and the second was Barbara Modliszewska.
- Katarzyna Modliszewska (died around 1512) - heiress of the property in Modliszewo Kościelny, member of the Order of St. Clare in Gniezno. She was the daughter of Wojciech Sitek Modliszewski and Anna Kołaty Kołacka.
- Jan Sitek Modliszewski (died before 1557) - heir in Modliszew Kościelny, owner of the estates in Wierzejcza and Dębłów. He inherited the estate in Wierzejcza from his uncle Mikołaj. Son of Wawrzyniec and Jadwiga Modliszewski. His wife was Magdalena Węgierska, daughter of Mikołaj.
- Elżbieta Modliszewska (died before 1653) - heiress of the estates in Modliszewo Kościelny, the only daughter of Jan Sitka and Katarzyna Rynarzewska. She was the wife of Daniel Karczewski, the heir of Karczew. In 1640 she sold her parts in Modliszewo Kościelny to Stanisław Modliszewski. She was mentioned by Kasper Niesiecki in "Polish Herbarz".
- Feliks Modliszewski (died before 1693) - lifelong landlord of the village council in Wierzbocice, heir to Elżbieta Karczewska née Modliszewska, father's cousin. He was the son of Bartłomiej and Anna Wilkowska. His spouse was Barbara Przeniewska (Przedniewska).

== See also ==
- Ostoja CoA
- Clan of Ostoja

== Bibliography ==
- Teki Dworzaczka. Materiały historyczno-genealogiczne do dziejów szlachty wielkopolskiej XV-XX w., Biblioteka Kórnicka PAN, Kórnik-Poznań 1995-2019 - Monografie - Modliszewscy h. Ostoja - Teki Dworzaczka.
- T. Jurek (red.), Słownik historyczno-geograficzny ziem polskich w średniowieczu, Instytut Historii Polskiej Akademii Nauk, 2010–2019, Poznań, cz. III, s. 817.
- K. Niesiecki, Herbarz polski, wyd. J.N. Bobrowicz, Lipsk 1839–1845, t. VI s. 445.
- W. J. Skowroński, Rody szlacheckie w Wielkopolsce w XVI – XIX w., Biblioteka Poznańskiego Towarzystwa Przyjaciół Nauk, litera M, (Modliszewscy), s. 160.
