= National road 92 (Poland) =

National road in Poland

National Road 92
- Droga krajowa nr 92
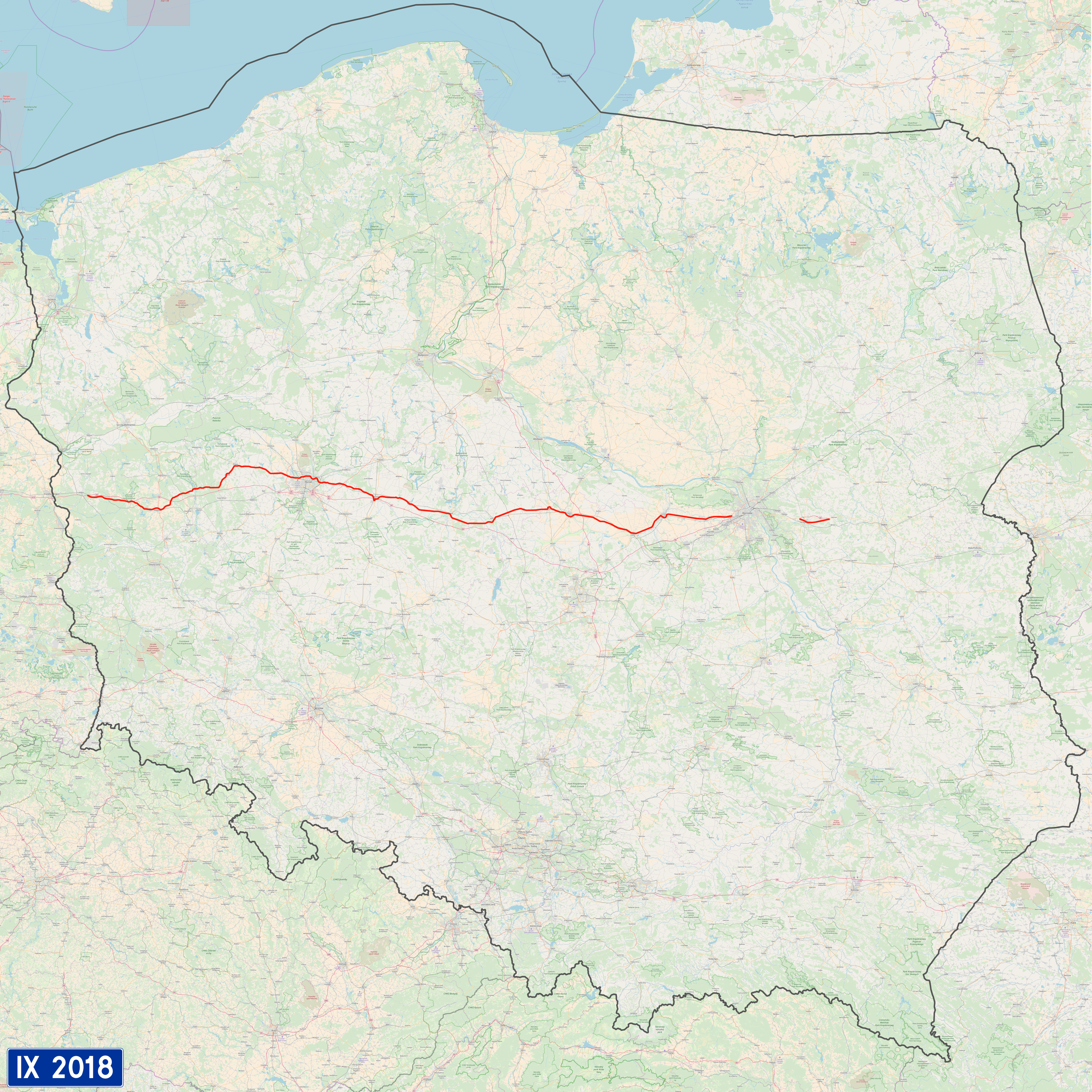

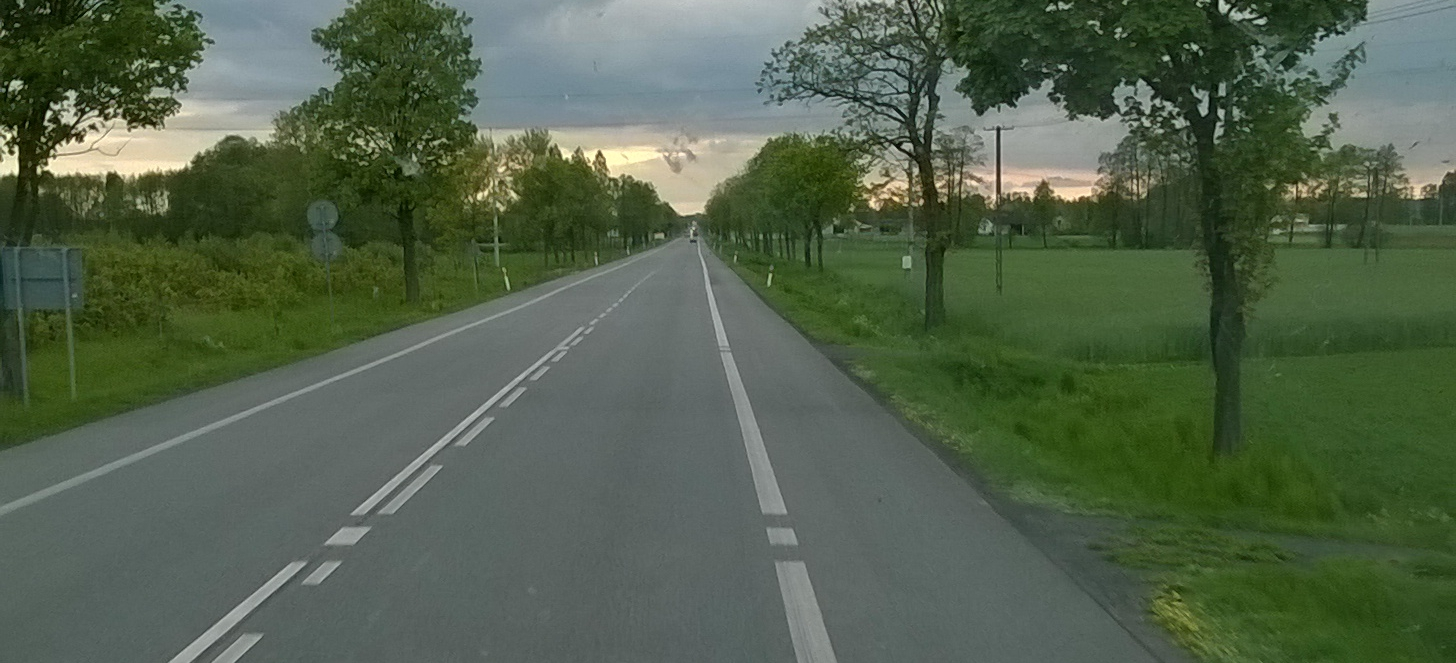
- National road 92 near Kłodawa, Greater Poland

Route information
- Maintained by GDDKiA
- Length: 472.7 km (293.7 mi)

Section 1
- West end: Rzepin
- East end: Mory

Section 2
- West end: Zakręt
- East end: Ryczołek

Location
- Country: Poland

Highway system
- National roads in Poland; Voivodeship roads
← DK 91	→ DK 93

National road 92 (Polish: droga krajowa nr 92) is a route belonging to Polish national roads network, which serves as an alternative route parallel to motorway A2. The road has one lane per direction on the majority of its length. Before the A2 motorway was constructed, it had served as the main connection between Warsaw, Poznań and the Polish-German border as DK 2; because of this, the route is sometimes referred to as "stara dwójka" (lit. "old two").

Before 2000, DK 92 ran from Gliwice through Mikołów to Tychy (in direction towards Bielsko-Biała); this is now part of DK 44.
