= National road 68 (Poland) =

National road in Poland

Coordinates: 52°05′08″N 23°32′08″E

National Road 68
- Droga krajowa nr 68

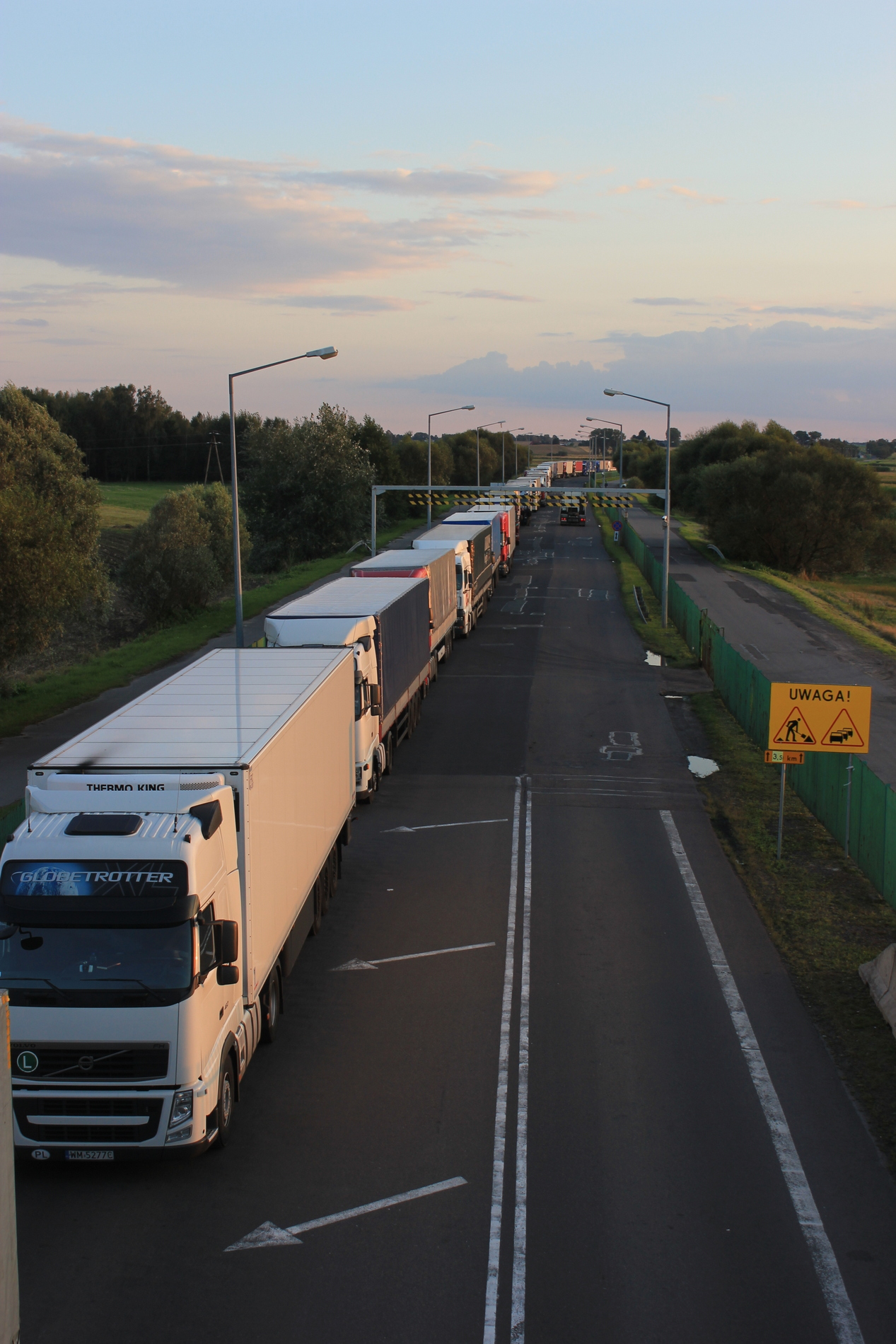
- National road 68 seen from the viaduct of voivodeship road 698, in direction to Wólka Dobryńska

Route information
- Part of E30
- Maintained by GDDKiA (on 5.197 kilometres (3.229 mi))
- Length: 11.4 km (7.1 mi)

Major junctions
- From: Kukuryki (PL-BY border)
- To: Wólka Dobryńska

Location
- Country: Poland
- Regions: Lublin Voivodeship

Highway system
- National roads in Poland; Voivodeship roads
← DK 67	→ DK 69

National road 68 (Polish: Droga krajowa nr 68, abbreviated as DK68) is a main road of accelerated traffic (Polish: droga główna ruchu przyspieszonego) belonging to the Polish national road network. The length of the route is 11.4 kilometres (7.1 mi), of which 5.197 kilometres (3.229 mi) is maintained by General Directorate for National Roads and Highways (Polish: Generalna Dyrekcja Dróg Krajowych i Autostrad, abbreviated as GDDKiA). The highway connects the Kukuryki border crossing on Belarus–Poland border with national road 2 in Wólka Dobryńska. It runs entirely in Lublin Voivodeship, in Biała County (Terespol and Zalesie gminas). According to signage, national road 68 is a component of European highway E30.

From February 14, 1986 until the road network reform in 2000, the route was signed as national road 812.

In the years 2005 – 2007, the road was reconstructed, as part of which, among others, the surface was renewed and strengthened to a load of 115 kN/axle. Also a concrete parking lane was built, 4 metres (13 ft) wide and approximately 5 kilometres (3.1 mi) long, stretching from the intersection with national road 2 in Wólka Dobryńska to the car terminal in Koroszczyn. The stretch from Koroszczyn terminal to the border crossing is accessible only for large goods vehicles and overlaps with planned course of motorway A2.

== Permissible axle load ==
From November 15, 2005 the entire route is accessible for vehicles with single axle load up to 11.5 tons, while previously it was up to 10 tons.

== Localities along the route ==
- Kukuryki, border with Belarus
- Koroszczyn
- Wólka Dobryńska (road 2)
