= Rogoziniec =

- Village
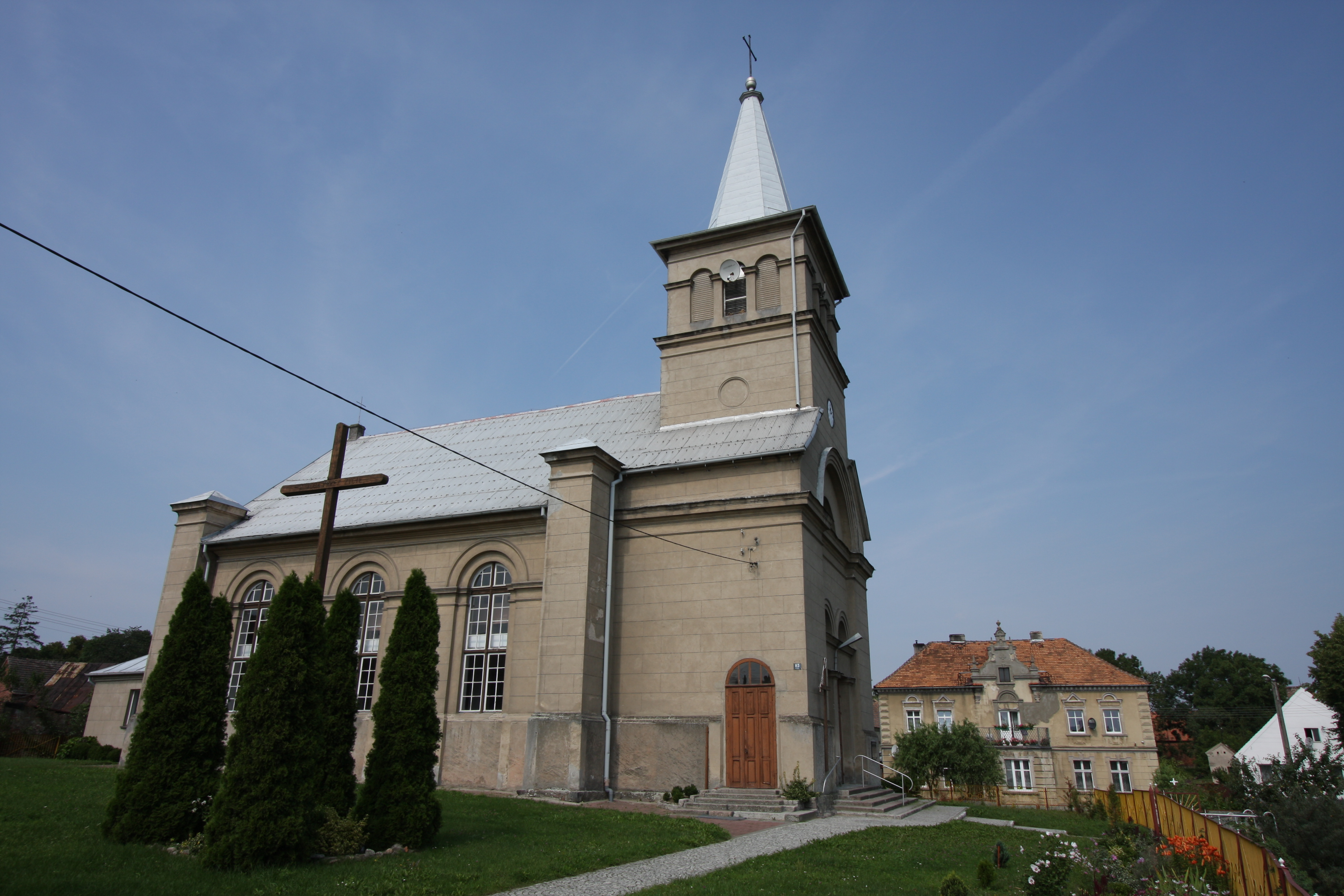
- Saint Joseph Church

- Location within Poland
- Coordinates: 52°18′N 15°47′E
- Country: Poland
- Voivodeship: Lubusz
- County: Świebodzin
- Gmina: Zbąszynek

Population
  - Total: 660
- Time zone: UTC+1 (CET)
  - Summer (DST): UTC+2 (CEST)
- Vehicle registration: FSW

Rogoziniec [rɔɡɔˈʑiɲɛt͡s] is a village in the administrative district of Gmina Zbąszynek, within Świebodzin County, Lubusz Voivodeship, in western Poland.

There is Autostrada A2 MOP(Miejsce Obsługi Podróżnych) called Rogoziniec which lies on the route of A2. MOP stands for rest place on the highway, which include parking, sometimes(like in this case) restaurant, petrol station, toilet etc.

== History ==
During World War II, in 1941–1942, Nazi Germany operated a forced labour camp for Jewish men in the village.
