= Voivodeship road 430 =

Road in Poland

Coordinates: 52°15′13″N 16°51′01″E

Voivodeship Road 430
- Droga wojewódzka nr 430
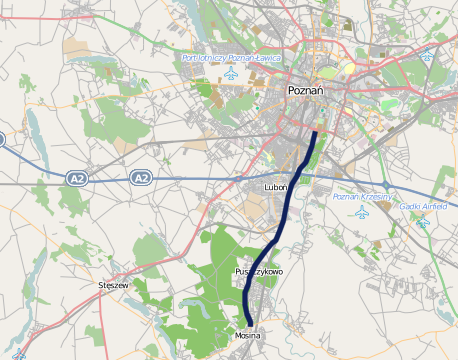

Route information
- Maintained by Wielkopolski Zarząd Dróg Wojewódzkich, Zarząd Dróg Miejskich w Poznaniu
- Length: 25 km (16 mi)

Major junctions
- From: Poznań
- To: Mosina

Location
- Country: Poland
- Regions: Greater Poland Voivodeship
- Major cities: Poznań

Highway system
- National roads in Poland; Voivodeship roads
← DW 429	→ DW 431

Voivodeship road 430 (Polish: Droga wojewódzka nr 430, abbreviated DW 430) is a route in the Polish voivodeship roads network. It runs through the Greater Poland Voivodeship (Poznań County), leading from Poznań, through Luboń and Puszczykowo to Mosina where it meets Voivodeship road 431.

== Major cities and towns along the route ==
- Poznań (motorway A2, national road 5, national road 11, voivodeship road 196, Voivodeship road 433)
- Luboń
- Puszczykowo
- Mosina (Voivodeship road 431)

== Route plan ==
km	Icon	Name	Crossed roads
x		Mosina	Mocka Street
x		Puszczykowo	Dworcowa Street
x		Puszczykowo	Poznańska Street
x		Łęczyca	Local road
x		Luboń	Kręta Street
x		Level crossing in Luboń, railway No. 271 Poznań — Wrocław	—
x		Luboń	Powstańców Wielkopolskich Street
x		Luboń	Dębiecka Street
x		Poznań – Luboń interchange (formerly "Dębina")	A2 E30 S5 E261 S11
x		Poznań	28 czerwca 1956 Street
x		Poznań – Filling station (Shell)	—
x		Poznań	Czechosłowacka Street
x		Short dual carriageway road stretch under railway bridge	—
x		Poznań	Piastowska Street
x		Poznań	Wspólna Street
x		Poznań – Dolna Wilda interchange	DW 196 DW 433
x		Voivodeship road 196 in direction to Rataje, Śródka, Murowana Goślina, Wągrowiec	DW 196
x		Voivodeship road 196 in direction to Górczyn, Interchange Poznań Komorniki	DW 196
x		Voivodeship road 433 in direction to Rataje, Interchange Poznań Krzesiny	DW 433
x		Voivodeship road 433 in direction to Ogrody, Piątkowo, Suchy Las	DW 433
1.000 mi = 1.609 km; 1.000 km = 0.621 mi
