= National road 69 (Poland) =

Former national road in Poland

Coordinates: 49°32′34″N 19°01′09″E

National Road 69
- Droga krajowa nr 69

Route information
- Maintained by GDDKiA
- Existed: 9 May 2000–4 August 2016
- History: Became a portion of DK 1

Major junctions
- From: Bielsko-Biała
- To: Zwardoń (PL-SK border)

Location
- Country: Poland
- Regions: Silesian Voivodeship
- Major cities: Bielsko-Biała, Żywiec

Highway system
- National roads in Poland; Voivodeship roads
← DK 68	→ DK 70

National road 69 (Polish: Droga krajowa nr 69, abbreviated as DK69) was a route belonging to the Polish national road network. The highway connected Bielsko-Biała with Poland–Slovakia border in Zwardoń.

From 1986 to 2000 the route was signed as:

- national road 94 from Bielsko-Biała to Żywiec
- national road 944 from Żywiec via Milówka and Zwardoń to country border.

On August 4, 2016, the entire route has been decommissioned and included in the course of national road 1, therefore the number 69 has been removed from the national roads network. Before 2016, national road 1 followed what is now national road 52 via Cieszyn to the state border.

== Expressway S69 ==
From 1996 to 2001, it was planned to build Expressway S94 on part of the northeast bypass of Bielsko-Biała, Żywiec – Przybędza stretch and Milówka – Zwardoń stretch. In 2001, the national road network was reformed and the section was renumbered to 69 and was built as S69. This became a portion of S1 Expressway in 2016; the old route of S1 became S52.

== Major cities and towns along the route ==
- Bielsko-Biała (road 52)
- Wilkowice
- Łodygowice
- Żywiec (road 945, road 946)
- Węgierska Górka
- Milówka
- Laliki (road 943)
- Zwardoń, border with Slovakia

== See also ==
- Expressway S1
