= Kukuryki =

- Village
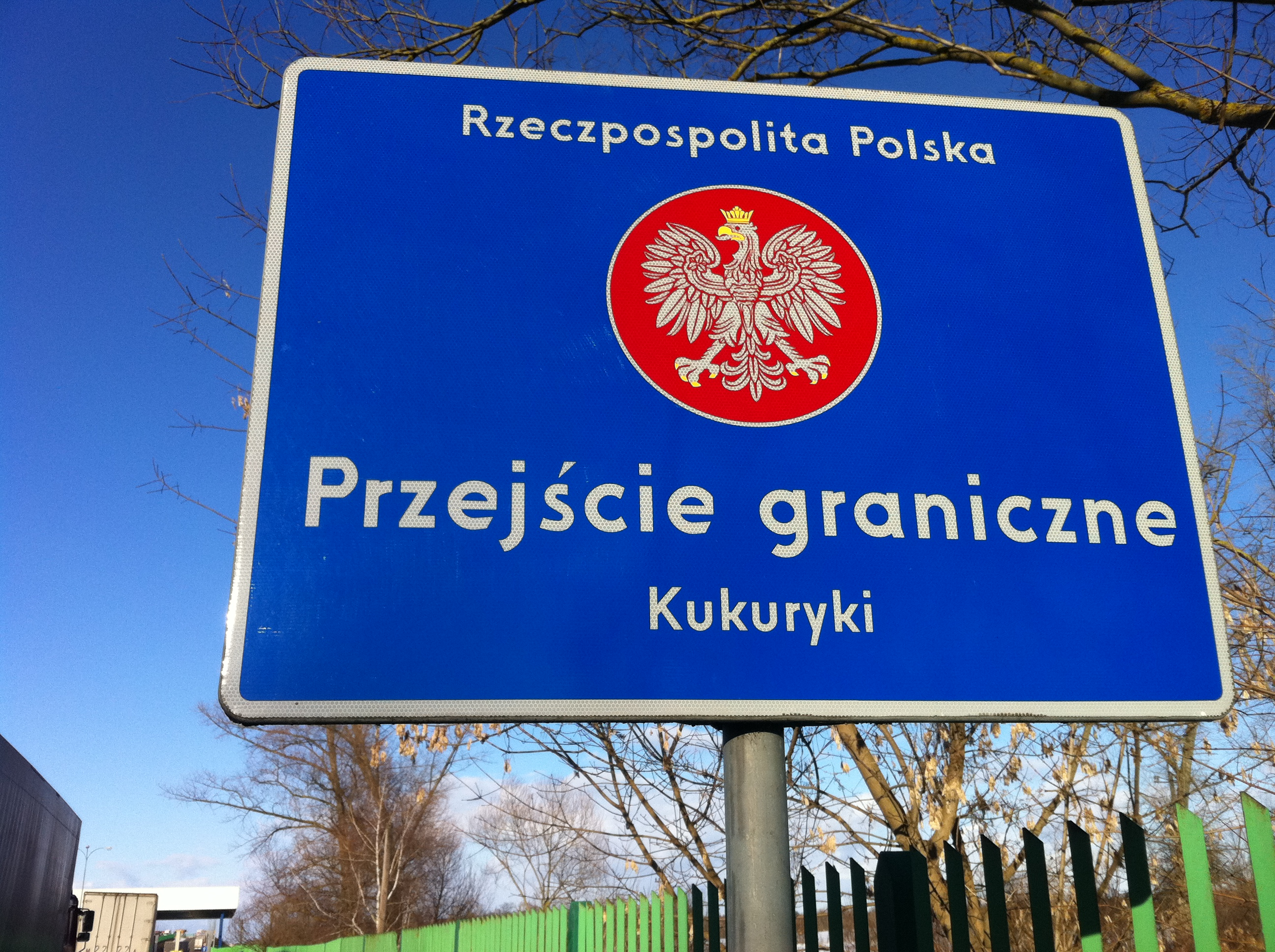

- Location within Poland
- Coordinates: 52°6′28″N 23°33′49″E
- Country: Poland
- Voivodeship: Lublin
- County: Biała
- Gmina: Terespol

Population
  - Total: 52

Kukuryki [kukuˈrɨkʲi] is a village in the administrative district of Gmina Terespol, within Biała County, Lublin Voivodeship, in eastern Poland, close to the border with Belarus.

A major road border crossing on Poland's National Road DK68 into Belarus is located at the village. Kazłovičy is located across the border. This crossing is an alternative to the Terespol-Brest crossing further south. Kukuryki is expected to be the eastern terminus of the planned extension of Poland's A2 motorway, which will connect with the Belarusian M 1 motorway across the border in Kazłovičy, north of Brest.
