= Małaszewicze =

- Village
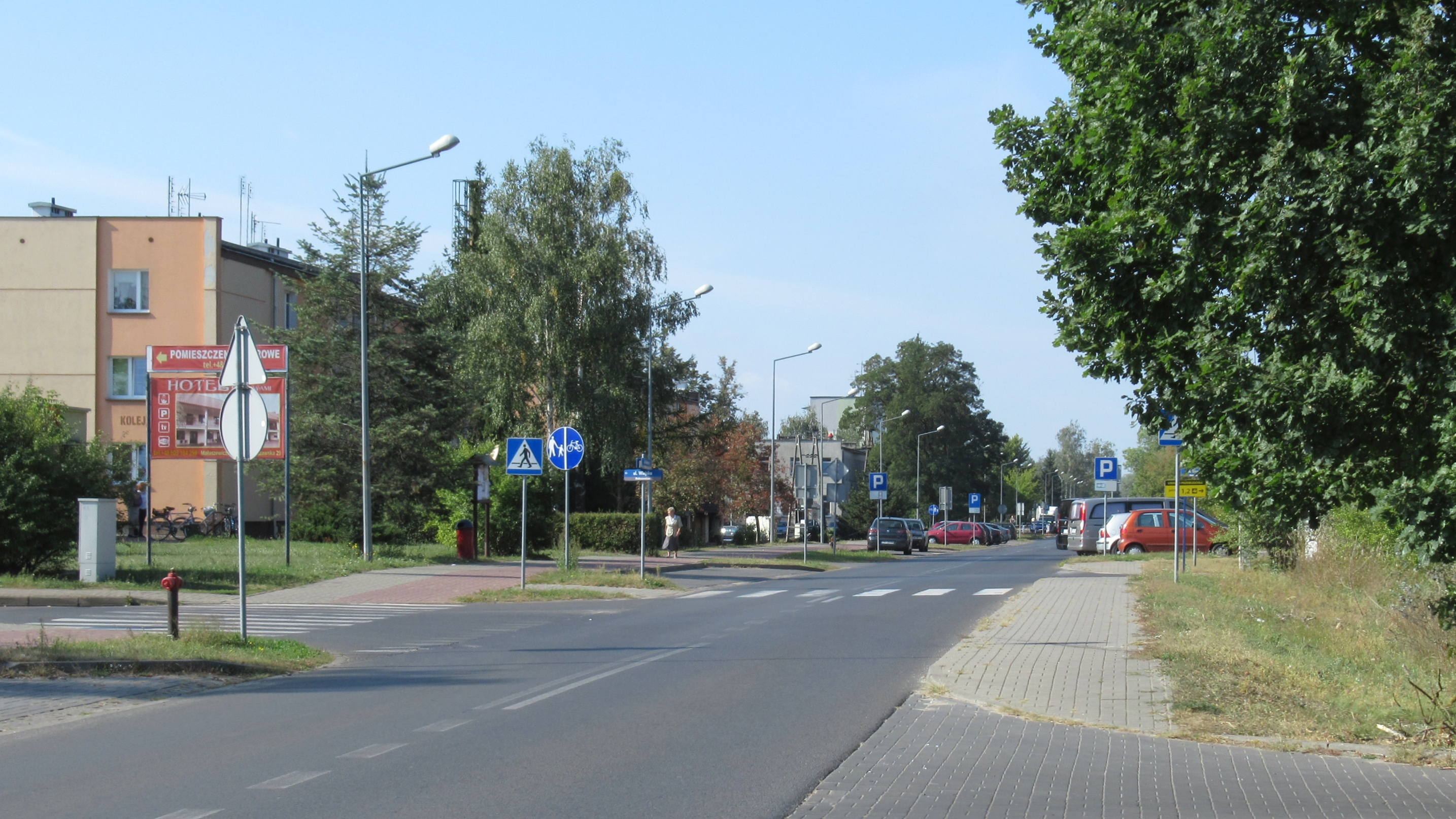
- Kolejarzy Street (Railwayman's Street) in village

- Location within Poland
- Coordinates: 52°1′N 23°31′E
- Country: Poland
- Voivodeship: Lublin
- County: Biała
- Gmina: Terespol

Population
  - Total: 4,000

Małaszewicze [mawaʂɛˈvʲit͡ʂɛ] is a village in the administrative district of Gmina Terespol, within Biała County, Lublin Voivodeship, in eastern Poland, close to the border with Belarus.

Małaszewicze hosts one of the largest dry cargo port stations in Europe. This is accomplished through transshipment of containers from rolling stock of broad-gauge (1520 mm) onto standard gauge (1435 mm) wagons, and vice versa.

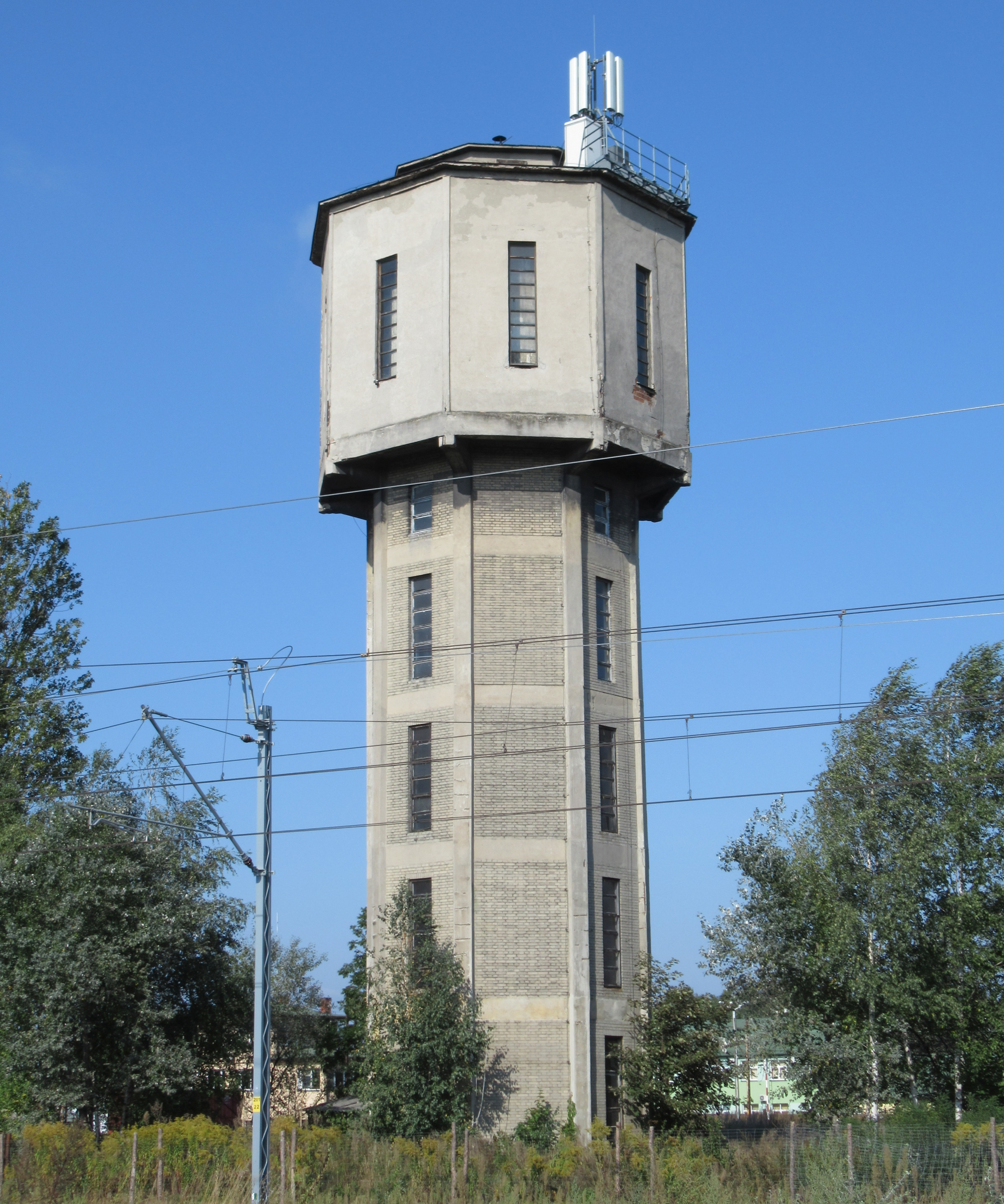
Water tower near train station

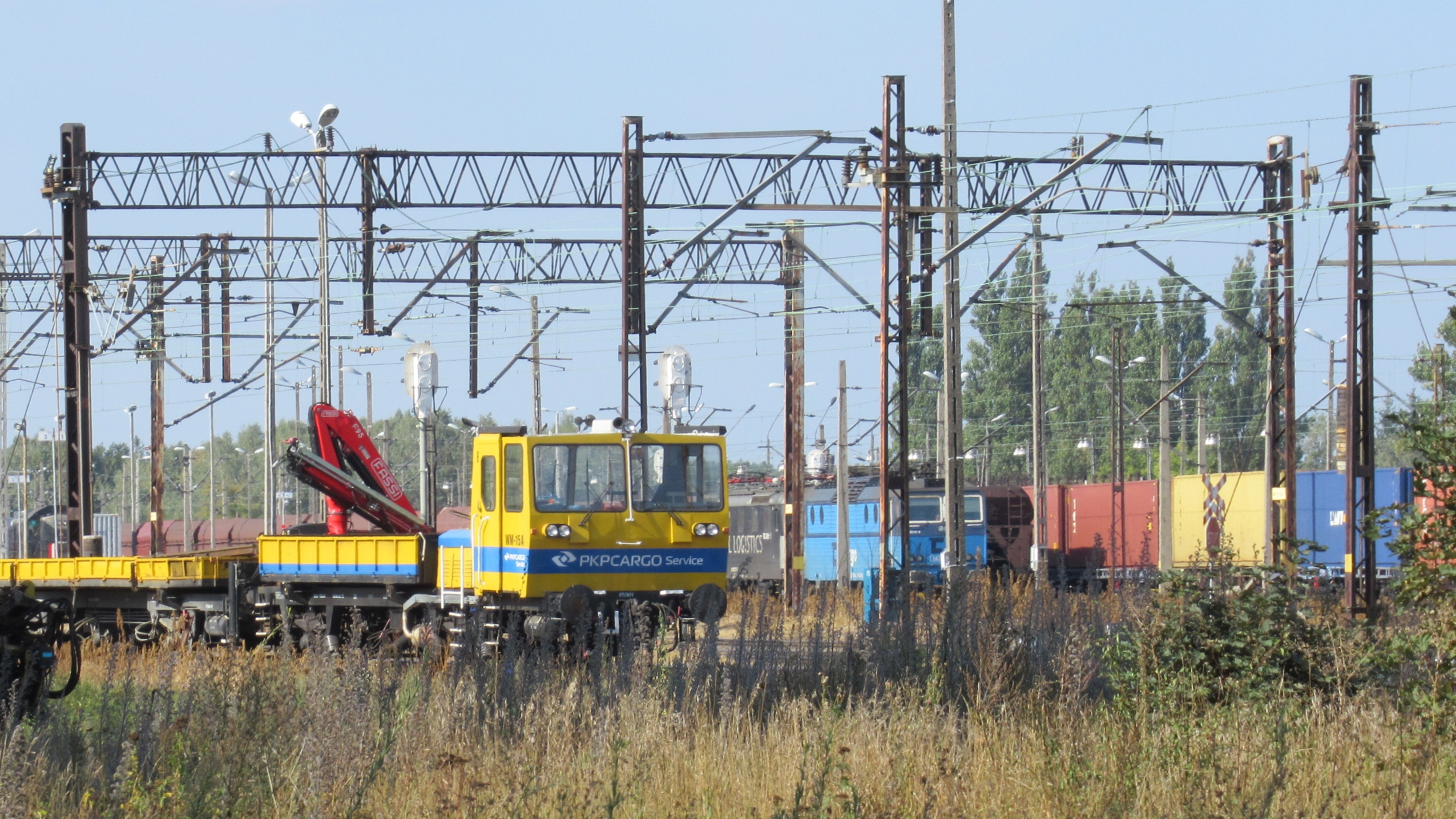
Railway freight station

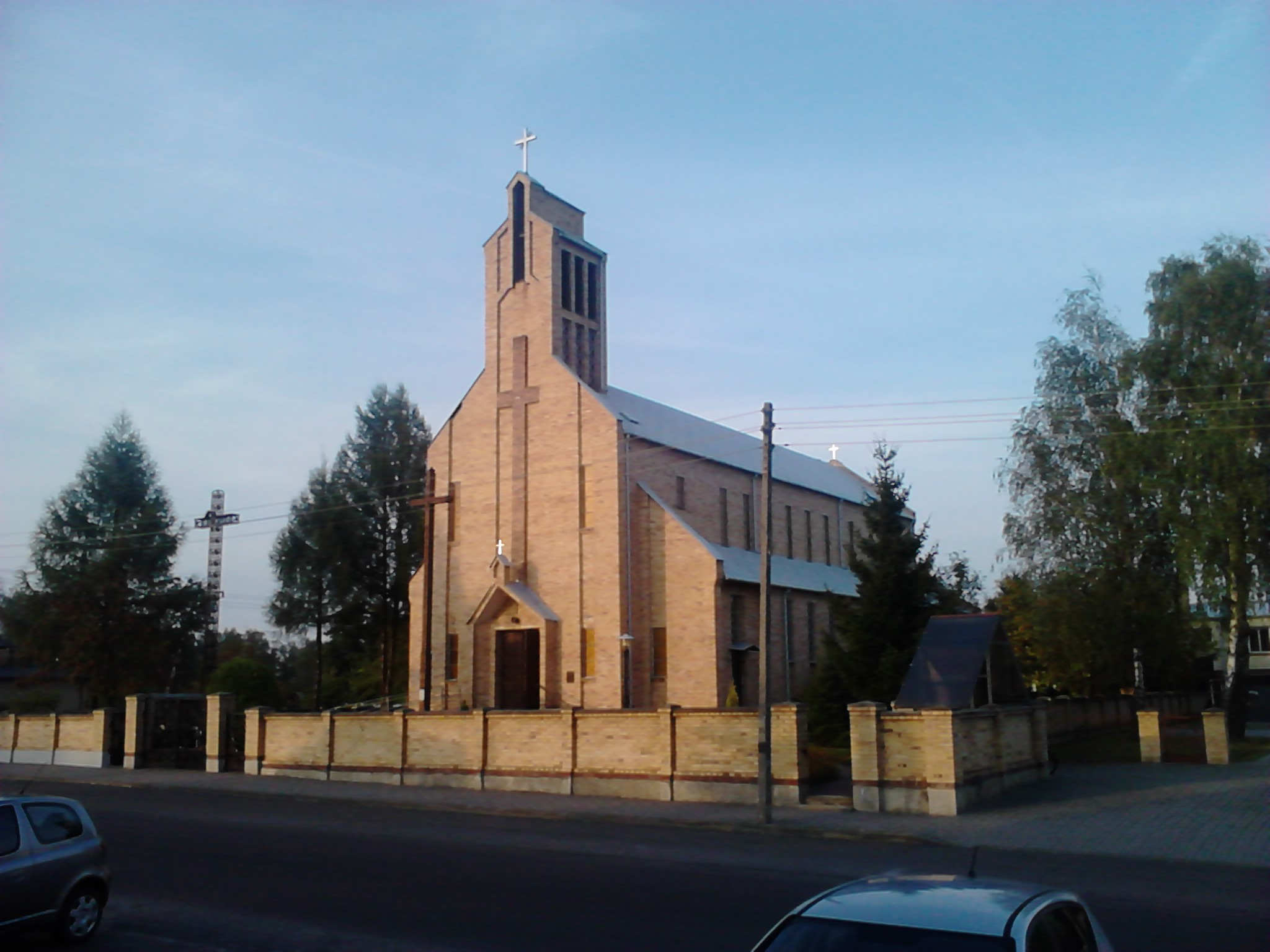
Church in Małaszewicze

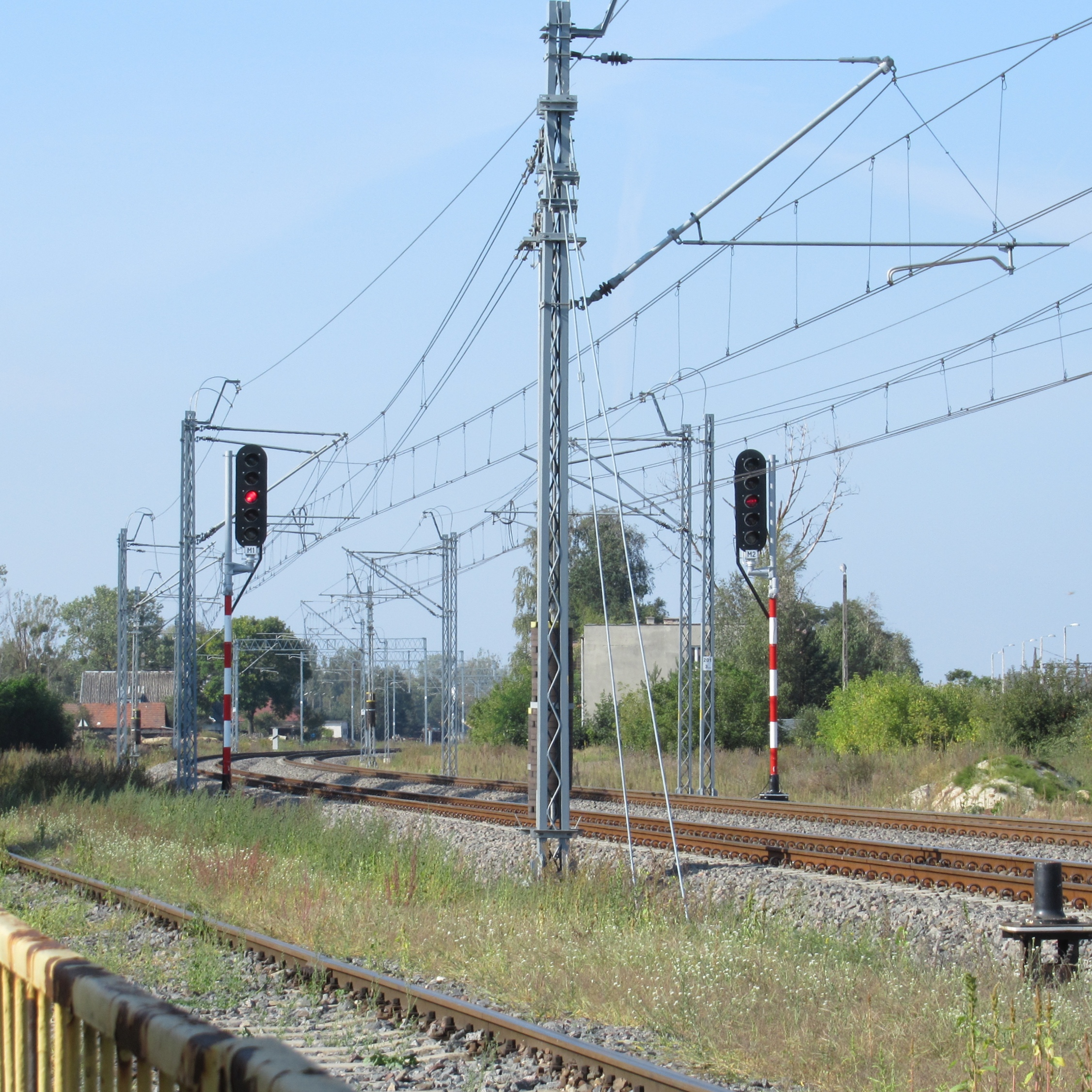
Railway line 2 in Małaszewicze

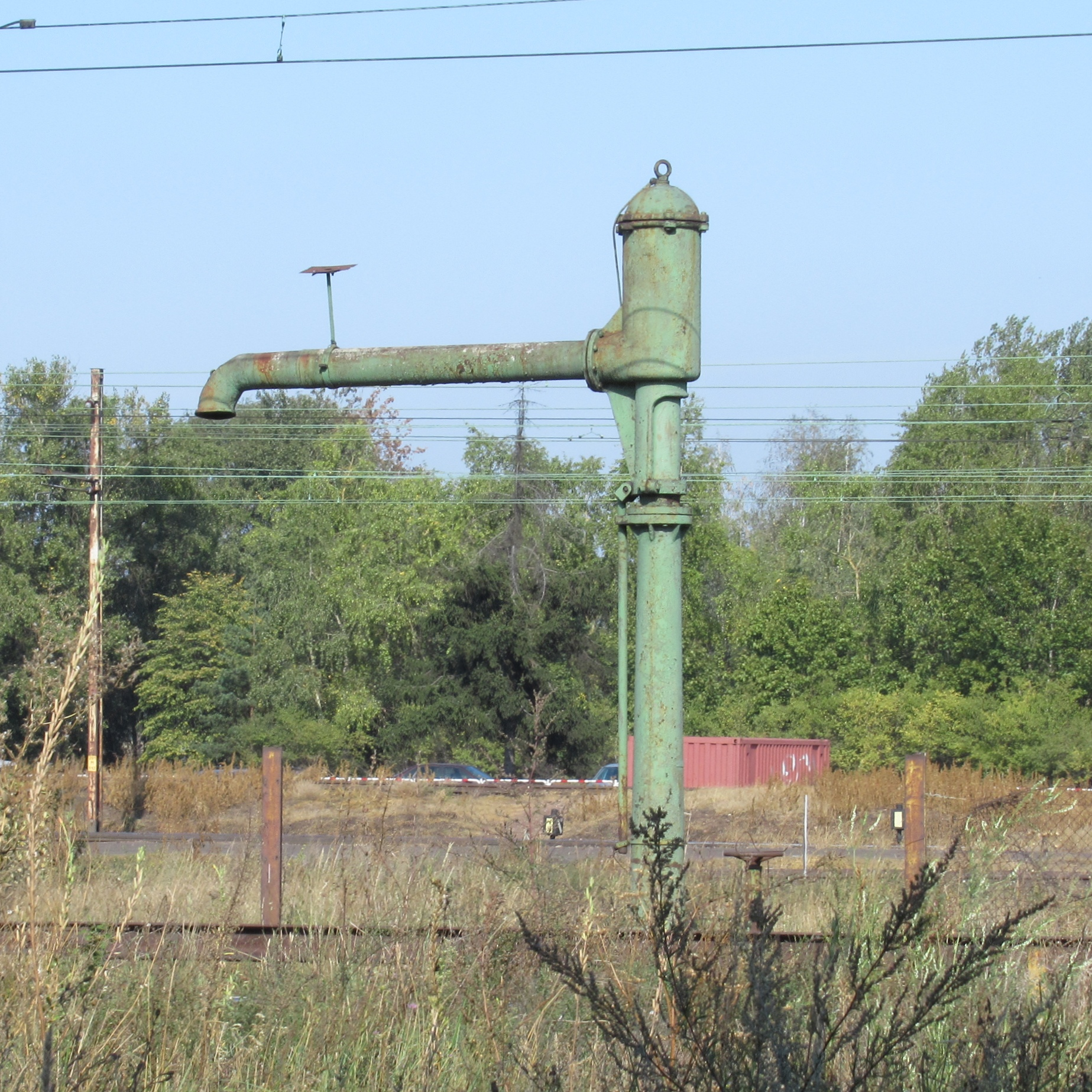
Disused water crane from the steam era
