= Modła Królewska =

- Village
- Location within Poland
- Coordinates: 52°9′12″N 18°12′19″E
- Country: Poland
- Voivodeship: Greater Poland
- County: Konin
- Gmina: Stare Miasto
- Population: 250

Modła Królewska [ˈmɔdwa kruˈlɛfska] is a village in the administrative district of Gmina Stare Miasto, within Konin County, Greater Poland Voivodeship, in west-central Poland.
