= Walewice, Lubusz Voivodeship =

Walewice
- Village
- Location within Poland
- Coordinates: 52°20′N 15°10′E
- Country: Poland
- Voivodeship: Lubusz
- County: Sulęcin
- Gmina: Torzym

Walewice [valɛˈvit͡sɛ] is a village in the administrative district of Gmina Torzym, within Sulęcin County, Lubusz Voivodeship, in western Poland.
