= Koryta, Lubusz Voivodeship =

Koryta
- Village
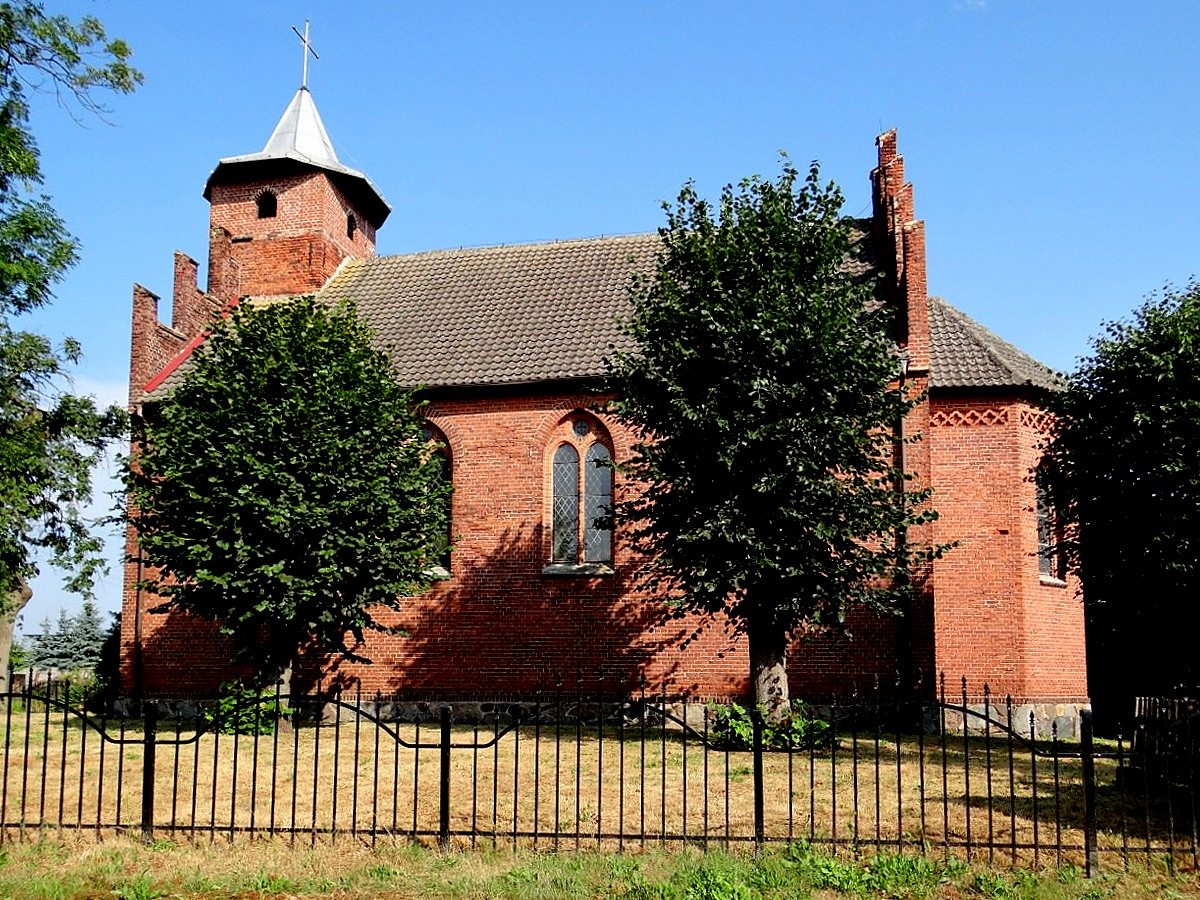
- Catholic church

- Location within Poland
- Coordinates: 52°18′N 15°10′E
- Country: Poland
- Voivodeship: Lubusz
- County: Sulęcin
- Gmina: Torzym
- Population: 258

Koryta [kɔˈrɨta] is a village in the administrative district of Gmina Torzym, within Sulęcin County, Lubusz Voivodeship, in western Poland.
