= Wolice =

- Village
- Location within Poland
- Coordinates: 52°51′N 17°55′E
- Country: Poland
- Voivodeship: Kuyavian-Pomeranian
- County: Żnin
- Gmina: Barcin

Wolice [vɔˈlʲit͡sɛ] is a village in the administrative district of Gmina Barcin, within Żnin County, Kuyavian-Pomeranian Voivodeship, in north-central Poland.
