= Gozdowo, Greater Poland Voivodeship =

Gozdowo
- Village
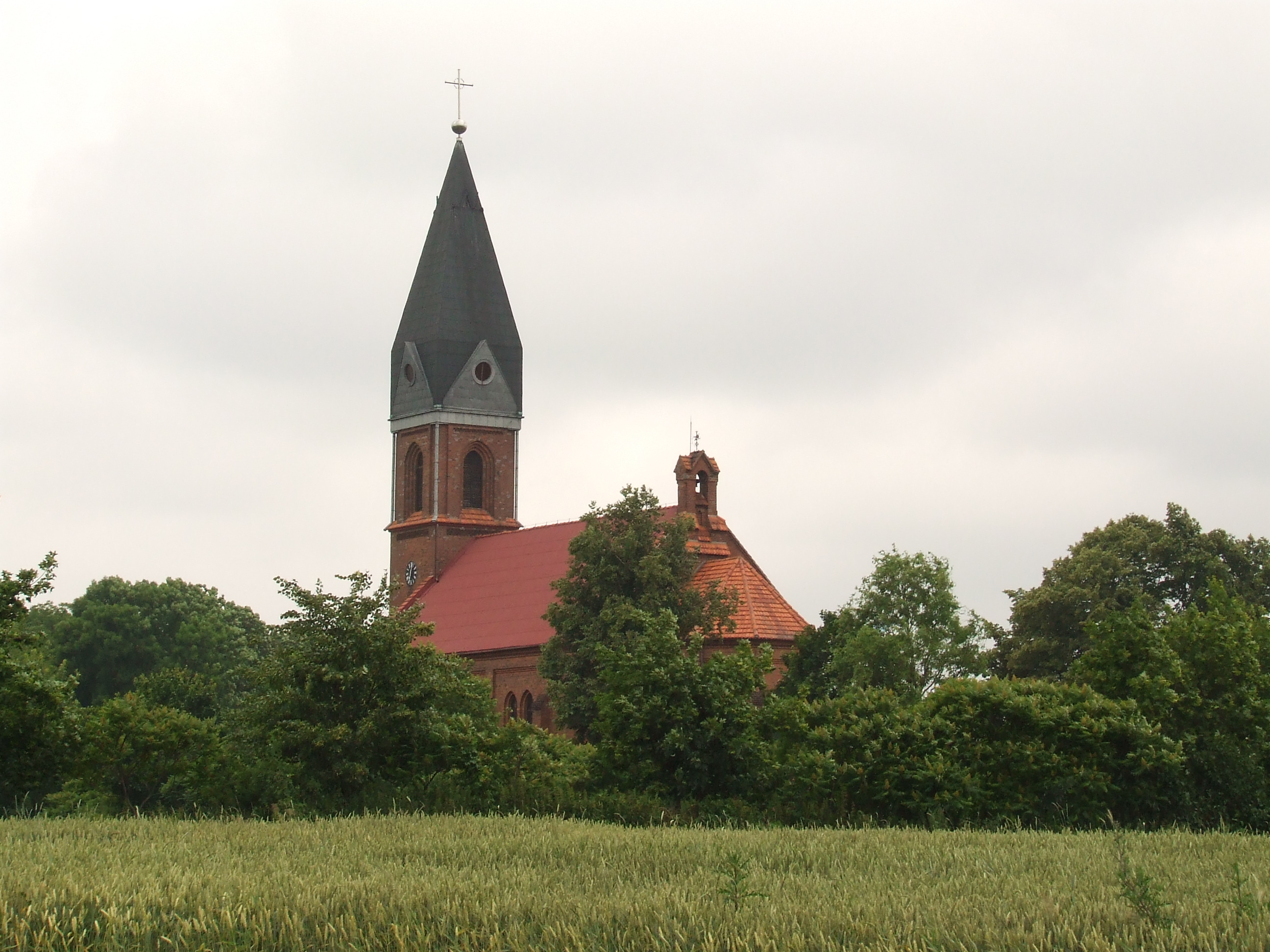
- Church of Saints Philip and James

- Location within Poland
- Coordinates: 52°17′N 17°38′E
- Country: Poland
- Voivodeship: Greater Poland
- County: Września
- Gmina: Września

Gozdowo [ɡɔzˈdɔvɔ] a village in the administrative district of Gmina Września, within Września County, Greater Poland Voivodeship, in west-central Poland.
