= Olesin, Turek County =

Olesin
- Village
- Location within Poland
- Coordinates: 52°9′12″N 18°27′45″E
- Country: Poland
- Voivodeship: Greater Poland
- County: Turek
- Gmina: Władysławów

Olesin [ɔˈlɛɕin] is a village in the administrative district of Gmina Władysławów, within Turek County, Greater Poland Voivodeship, in west-central Poland.
