= Konotopa, Warsaw West County =

Konotopa
- Village
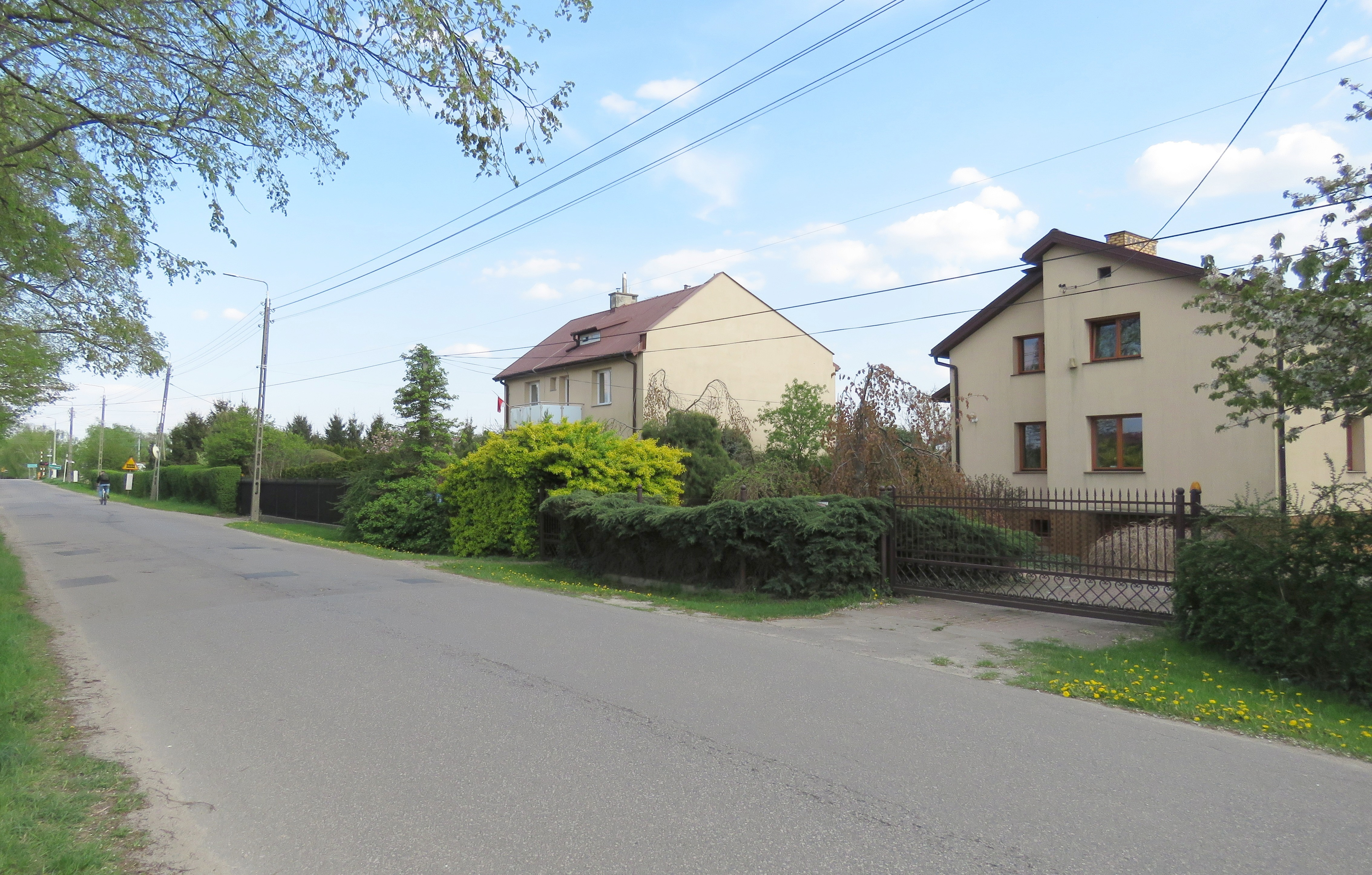

- Location within Poland
- Coordinates: 52°11′47″N 20°49′3″E
- Country: Poland
- Voivodeship: Masovian
- County: Warsaw West
- Gmina: Ożarów Mazowiecki
- Time zone: UTC+1 (CET)
  - Summer (DST): UTC+2 (CEST)

Konotopa [kɔnɔˈtɔpa] is a village in the administrative district of Gmina Ożarów Mazowiecki, within Warsaw West County, Masovian Voivodeship, in central Poland.

Five Polish citizens were murdered by Nazi Germany in the village during World War II.
