= Ryczołek =

- Village
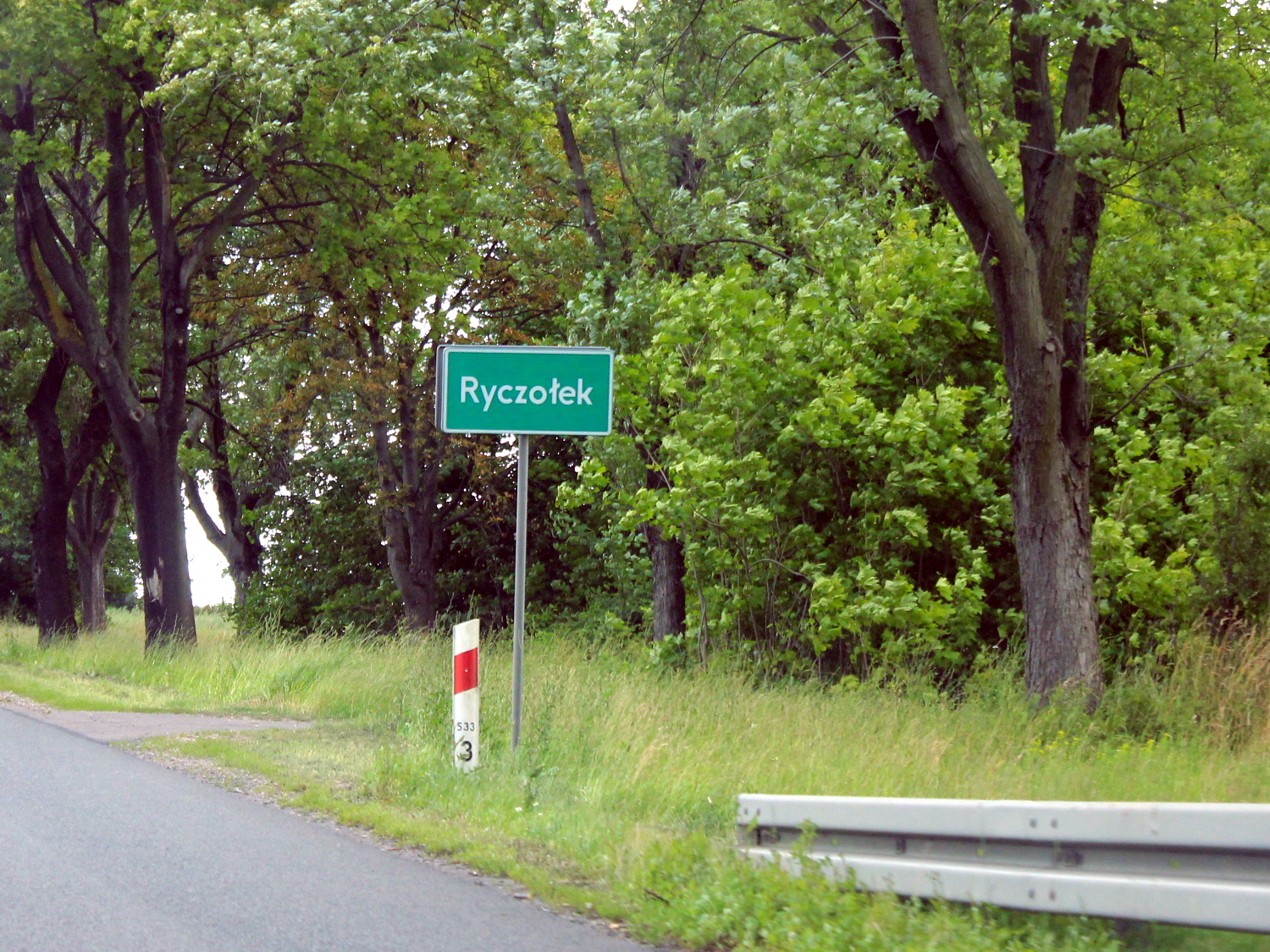

- Location within Poland
- Coordinates: 52°11′N 21°46′E
- Country: Poland
- Voivodeship: Masovian
- County: Mińsk
- Gmina: Kałuszyn
- Population: 140
- Website: http://www.ryczolek.pl

Ryczołek [rɨˈt͡ʂɔwɛk] is a village in the administrative district of Gmina Kałuszyn, within Mińsk County, Masovian Voivodeship, in east-central Poland.
