= Jagodziński =

Jagodziński [jaɡɔd͡zˈiɲski] (feminine: Jagodzińska [jaɡɔd͡zˈiɲska]; plural: Jagodzińscy [jaɡɔd͡zˈiɲst͡sɨ]) is a Polish surname which is most frequent in the central voivodeships of Greater Poland, Kuyavia-Pomerania, Łódź and Masovia and can also be found among the Polish diaspora. It was first recorded in 1400 and is of toponymic origin, deriving from either one of several Polish locations named Jagodno, but most probably from the Jagodno in the Greater Poland Voivodeship. The place name Jagodno itself is derived from the west Slavic word "jagoda" for berry.

== People ==
- Anna Jagodzińska (born 1987), Polish fashion model
- Christian Jagodzinski (born 1969), German Internet entrepreneur and real estate investor
- Heinz Jagodzinski (1916–2012), German physicist and crystallographer
- Henryk Jagodziński (1925–2002), Polish Olympic athlete
- Henryk Jagodziński (nuncio) (born 1969), Vatican diplomat
- Jan Jagodzinski (born 1948), Canadian academic
- Jeff Jagodzinski (born 1963), American football coach
- Stefan Jagodziński, Polish resistance fighter and Righteous Among the Nations
- Carmen Voicu-Jagodzinsky (born 1981), Romanian chess master
- Waldemar Jagodziński (1934–2021), Polish chess master

== See also ==
- Jagoda
- Jahoda
