= Yagoda (disambiguation) =

Yagoda is a Russian surname.

Yagoda may also refer to:

- Yagoda, Bulgaria, village in Bulgaria
- Yagoda, Sri Lanka, town in Sri Lanka
- Yagoda, previous name of Soviet ship SS Dalstroy

== See also ==
- Jagoda
- Jahoda
