= Szlachecka =

Szlachecka may refer to the following places in Poland:

- Szlachecka, Łódź Voivodeship
- Szlachecka, Podkarpackie Voivodeship
- Chomiąża Szlachecka
- Chruszczewka Szlachecka
- Dąbrowa Szlachecka
- Długa Szlachecka
- Dzierzązna Szlachecka
- Glinka Szlachecka
- Kamienica Szlachecka
- Kępka Szlachecka
- Klwatka Szlachecka
- Nowa Wieś Szlachecka
- Rewica Szlachecka
- Topola Szlachecka
- Tchórznica Szlachecka
- Wierzbica Szlachecka
- Wistka Szlachecka
- Wólka Szlachecka

== See also ==
- Okolica szlachecka
