= Duchovny =

Duchovny may refer to:

== People ==
Duchowny (Polish pronunciation: [duˈxɔv.nɨ], feminine: Duchowna) is a Polish-language surname literally meaning "clergyman". Variants include Duchovny and Ducovny. Notable people with the surname include:

- Amram Ducovny (1927–2003), American non-fiction, play and novel writer
- David Duchovny (born 1960), American actor
- Daniel Duchovny (known as Danny Ducovny and also credited as Daniel Duchovny), a director of commercials
- West Duchovny (born 1999), American actress

== Places in Poland ==
- Garlica Duchowna, village in Gmina Zielonki, within Kraków County, Lesser Poland Voivodeship
- Glinka Duchowna, village in Gmina Kostrzyn, within Poznań County, Greater Poland Voivodeship
- Górka Duchowna, village in Gmina Lipno, within Leszno County, Greater Poland Voivodeship
- Krusza Duchowna, village in Gmina Inowrocław, within Inowrocław County, Kuyavian-Pomeranian Voivodeship
- Przeginia Duchowna, village in Gmina Czernichów, within Kraków County, Lesser Poland Voivodeship
- Sadków Duchowny, village in Gmina Belsk Duży, within Grójec County, Masovian Voivodeship
- Wola Duchowna, village in Gmina Czermin, within Pleszew County, Greater Poland Voivodeship

== Other ==
- David Duchovny (song)
