= Tarnow =

Tarnow may refer to:

== Places ==
=== Germany ===
- Tarnow, Germany, a municipality in the Rostock district, in Mecklenburg-Vorpommern

=== Poland ===
- Tarnów, a city in Lesser Poland Voivodeship, south Poland
- Tarnów County, Lesser Poland Voivodeship
- Tarnów Voivodeship, a former administrative unit in Poland, now part of the Lesser Poland Voivodeship
- Tarnów, Lower Silesian Voivodeship, south-west Poland
- Tarnów, Lublin Voivodeship, east Poland
- Tarnów, Masovian Voivodeship, east-central Poland
- Tarnów, Opole Voivodeship, south-west Poland
- Tarnów, Gorzów County in Lubusz Voivodeship, west Poland
- Tarnów, Żary County in Lubusz Voivodeship, west Poland

== People with the surname ==
- Arthur Tarnow (1942-2022), United States District Court judge
- Dennis P. Tarnow, American dentist and authority on implant dentistry
- Fanny Tarnow (1779–1862), German writer
- Fritz Tarnow (1880–1951), German politician
- Rudolf Tarnow (1867–1933), Low German writer
- Toby Tarnow (born 1937), Canadian actress

== Other uses ==
- Unia Tarnów (sports club), based in Tarnów, Lesser Poland Voivodeship

== See also ==
- Fürstenberg/Havel, a town in the Oberhavel district, Brandenburg, Germany formerly called Tarnow or Tornow
  - Battle of Tornow, fought in 1758 near modern-day Fürstenberg/Havel between the forces of Prussia and Sweden during the Seven Years' War
- Tarnov (disambiguation)
- Tarnowo (disambiguation)
- Tarnowski family
- Tarnowskie Góry
- Veliko Tarnovo
