= Zagacie, Lesser Poland Voivodeship =

Zagacie
- Village
- Location within Poland
- Coordinates: 50°0′10″N 19°42′1″E
- Country: Poland
- Voivodeship: Lesser Poland
- County: Kraków
- Gmina: Czernichów
- Population: 721

Zagacie [zaˈɡat͡ɕɛ] is a village in the administrative district of Gmina Czernichów, within Kraków County, Lesser Poland Voivodeship, in southern Poland.
