= Wiktorowo, Gmina Kostrzyn =

Wiktorowo
- Village
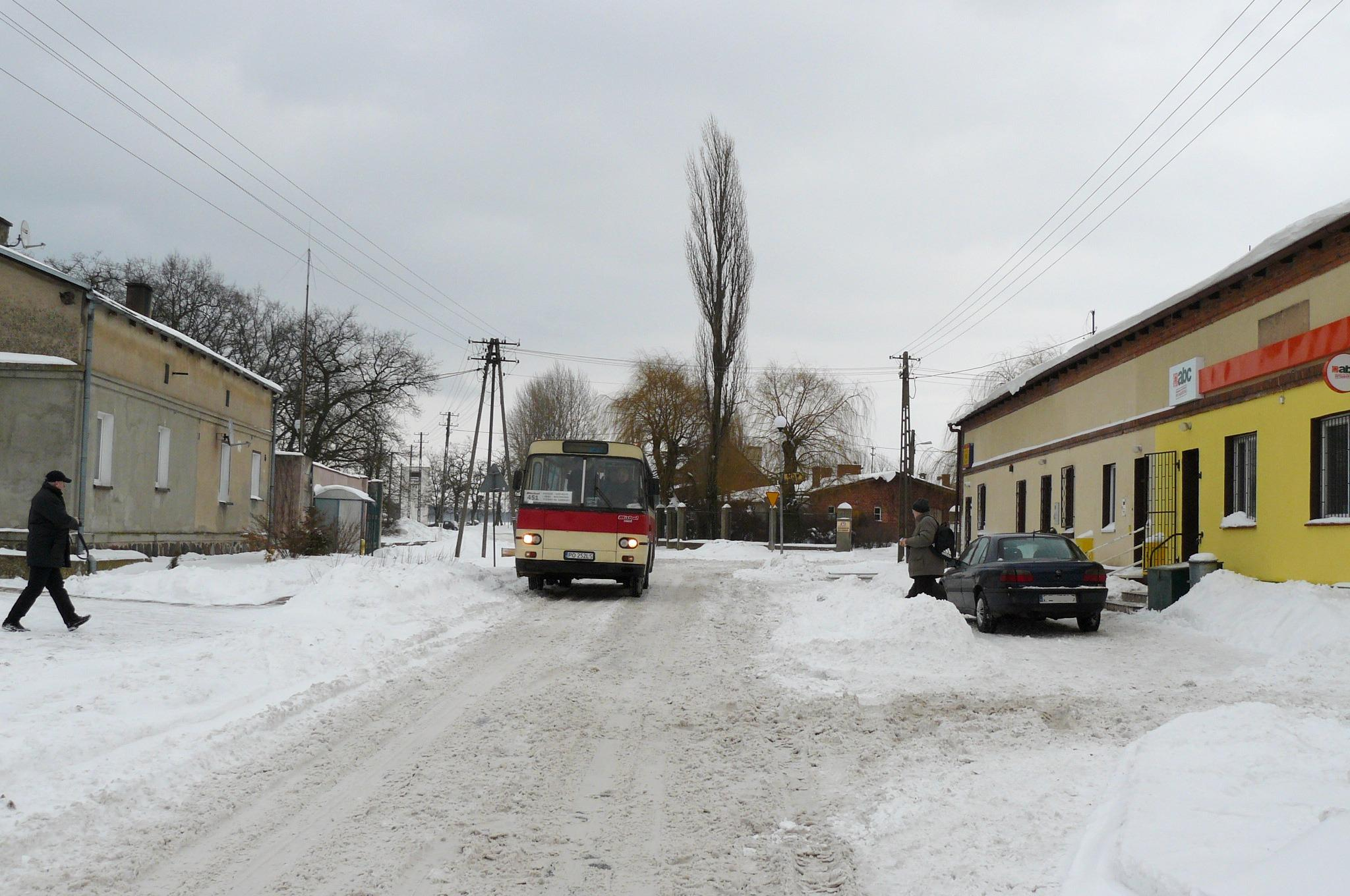

- Location within Poland
- Coordinates: 52°24′12″N 17°17′50″E
- Country: Poland
- Voivodeship: Greater Poland
- County: Poznań
- Gmina: Kostrzyn

Wiktorowo [viktɔˈrɔvɔ] is a village in the administrative district of Gmina Kostrzyn, within Poznań County, Greater Poland Voivodeship, in west-central Poland.
