= Gwiazdowo, Greater Poland Voivodeship =

Gwiazdowo
- Village
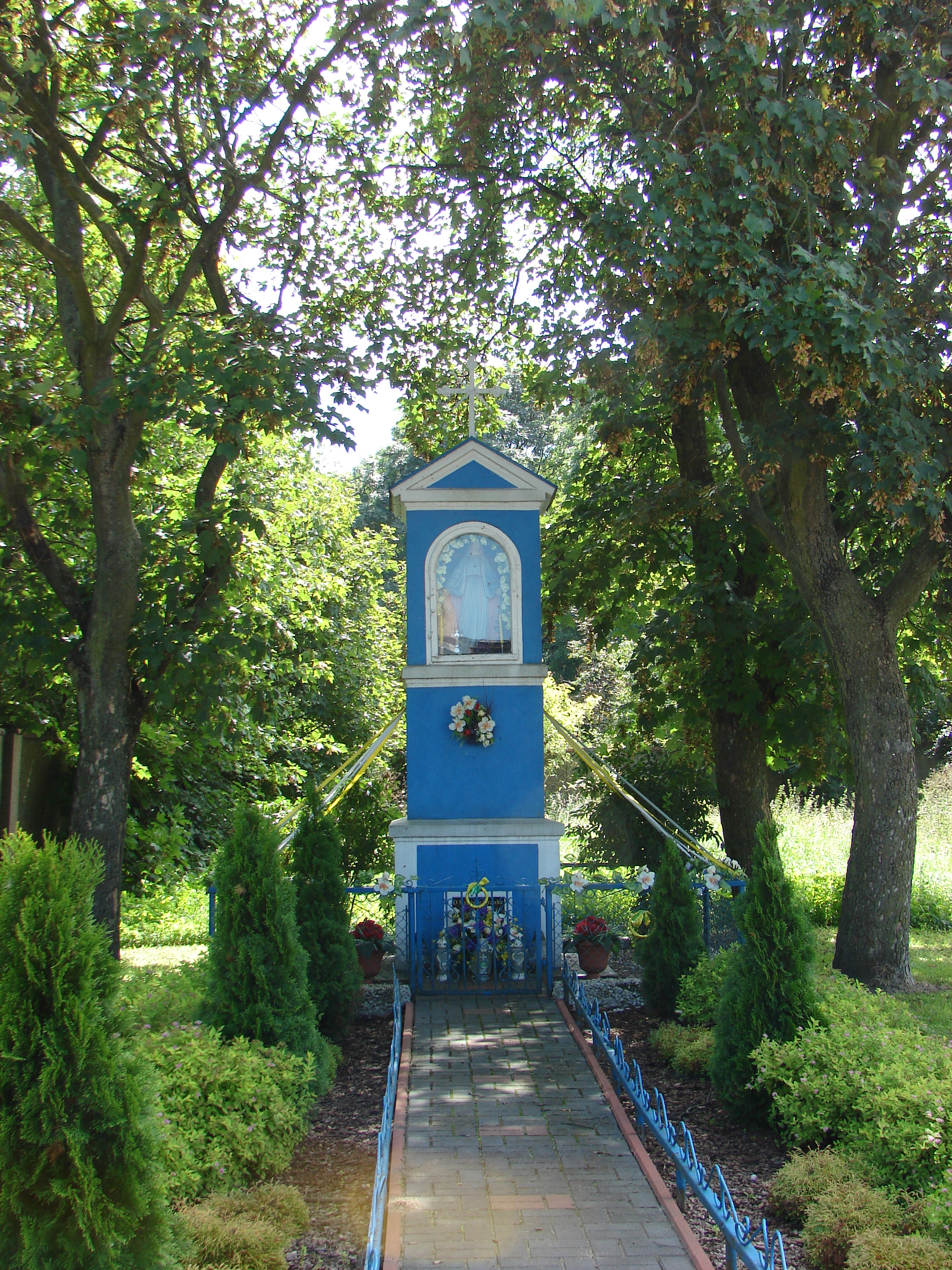
- Wayside shrine

- Location within Poland
- Coordinates: 52°24′58″N 17°12′38″E
- Country: Poland
- Voivodeship: Greater Poland
- County: Poznań
- Gmina: Kostrzyn
- Population: 350

Gwiazdowo [ɡvjazˈdɔvɔ] is a village in the administrative district of Gmina Kostrzyn, within Poznań County, Greater Poland Voivodeship, in west-central Poland.
