= Czerlejno =

- Village
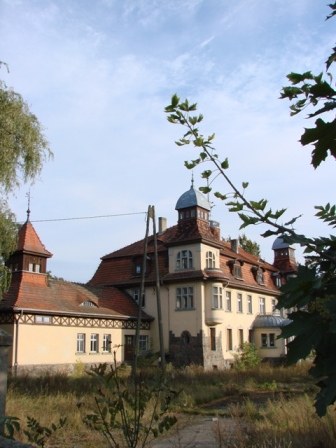
- Czerlejno Palace

- Location within Poland
- Coordinates: 52°21′N 17°13′E
- Country: Poland
- Voivodeship: Greater Poland
- County: Poznań
- Gmina: Kostrzyn
- Population: 560

Czerlejno [t͡ʂɛrˈlɛi̯nɔ] is a village in the administrative district of Gmina Kostrzyn, within Poznań County, Greater Poland Voivodeship, in west-central Poland.
