= Wołowice =

- Village
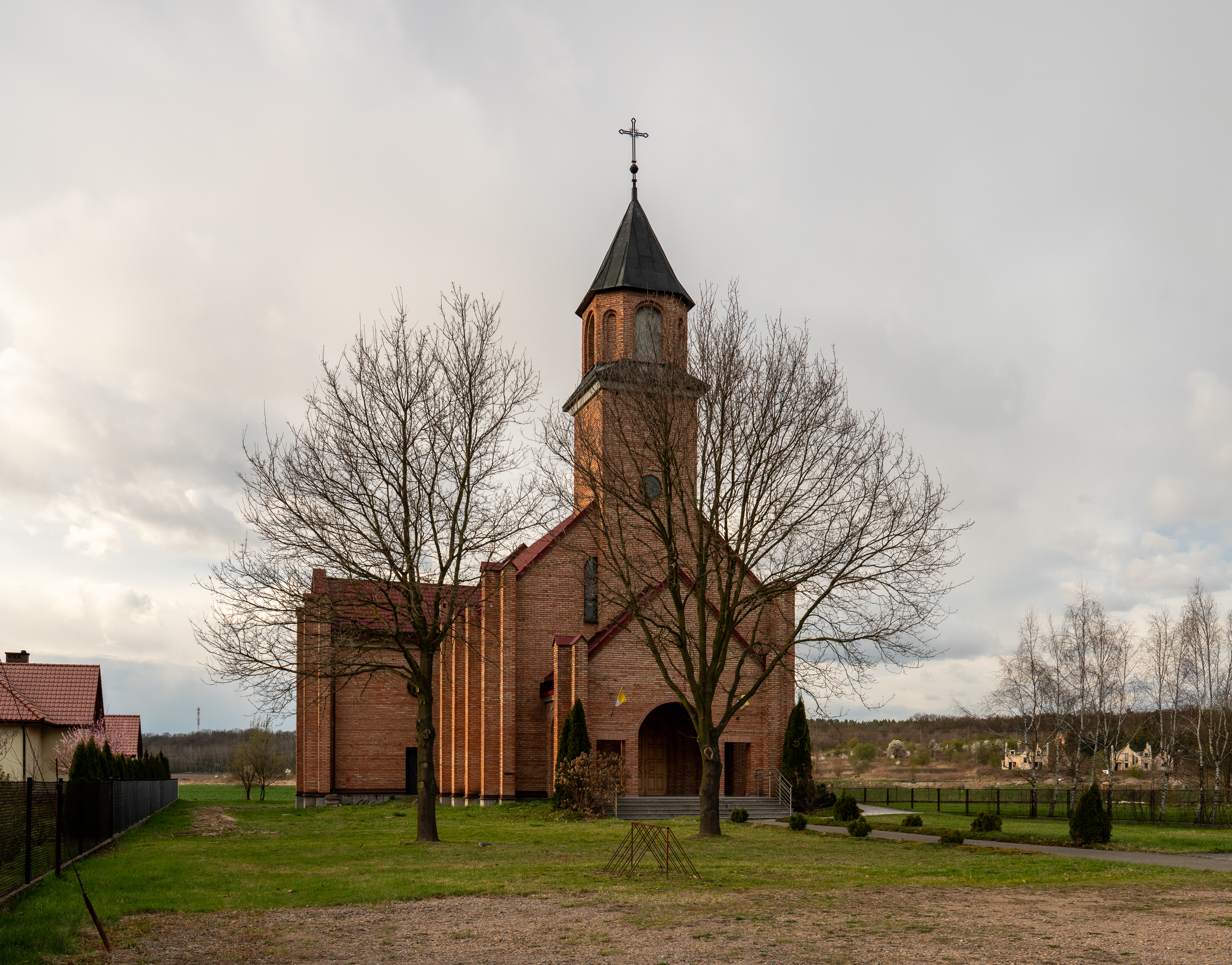
- Catholic church

- Location within Poland
- Coordinates: 49°59′N 19°44′E
- Country: Poland
- Voivodeship: Lesser Poland
- County: Kraków
- Gmina: Czernichów
- Population: 1,334

Wołowice [vɔwɔˈvit͡sɛ] is a village in the administrative district of Gmina Czernichów, within Kraków County, Lesser Poland Voivodeship, in southern Poland.
