= Jagoda =

- Pronunciation: [jaˈɡɔda]

Origin
- Meaning: Strawberry (Serbo-Croatian); Berry (Polish)

Other names
- Related names: Jahoda, Yahoda, Jabinda Yagoda

Jagoda is a gender-neutral surname and feminine given name. Especially common in Poland and Croatia, it means "berry" or "strawberry" in Slavic languages. Other forms include Jahoda (Czech and Slovak), Yahoda (Ukrainian), and Yagoda (Russian).

Jagoda is a gender-neutral native surname in Sri Lanka as well. Its pronunciation is different to the European pronunciations.

== As a surname ==
- Andy S. Jagoda, American medical academic
- Dhamma Jagoda (1941–1988), Sri Lankan dramatist
- Flory Jagoda (1923–2021), American guitarist
- Marcin Jagoda (born 1980), American volleyball player
- Wojciech Jagoda (born 1962), Polish footballer

== As a given name ==
- Jagoda Buić (1930–2022), Croatian visual artist
- Jagoda Kaloper (1947–2016), Croatian painter
- Jagoda Kibil (born 1999), Polish Paralympic athlete
- Jagoda Marinić (born 1977), German author
- Jagoda Pike, Canadian business executive of Croatian origin
- Jagoda Stach (born 1983), Polish child actress
- Jagoda Szmytka (born 1982), Polish composer
- Jagoda Truhelka (1864–1957), Yugoslav writer and pedagogist

== See also ==
- Yagoda
