= Czernichów, Kraków County =

Czernichów
- Village
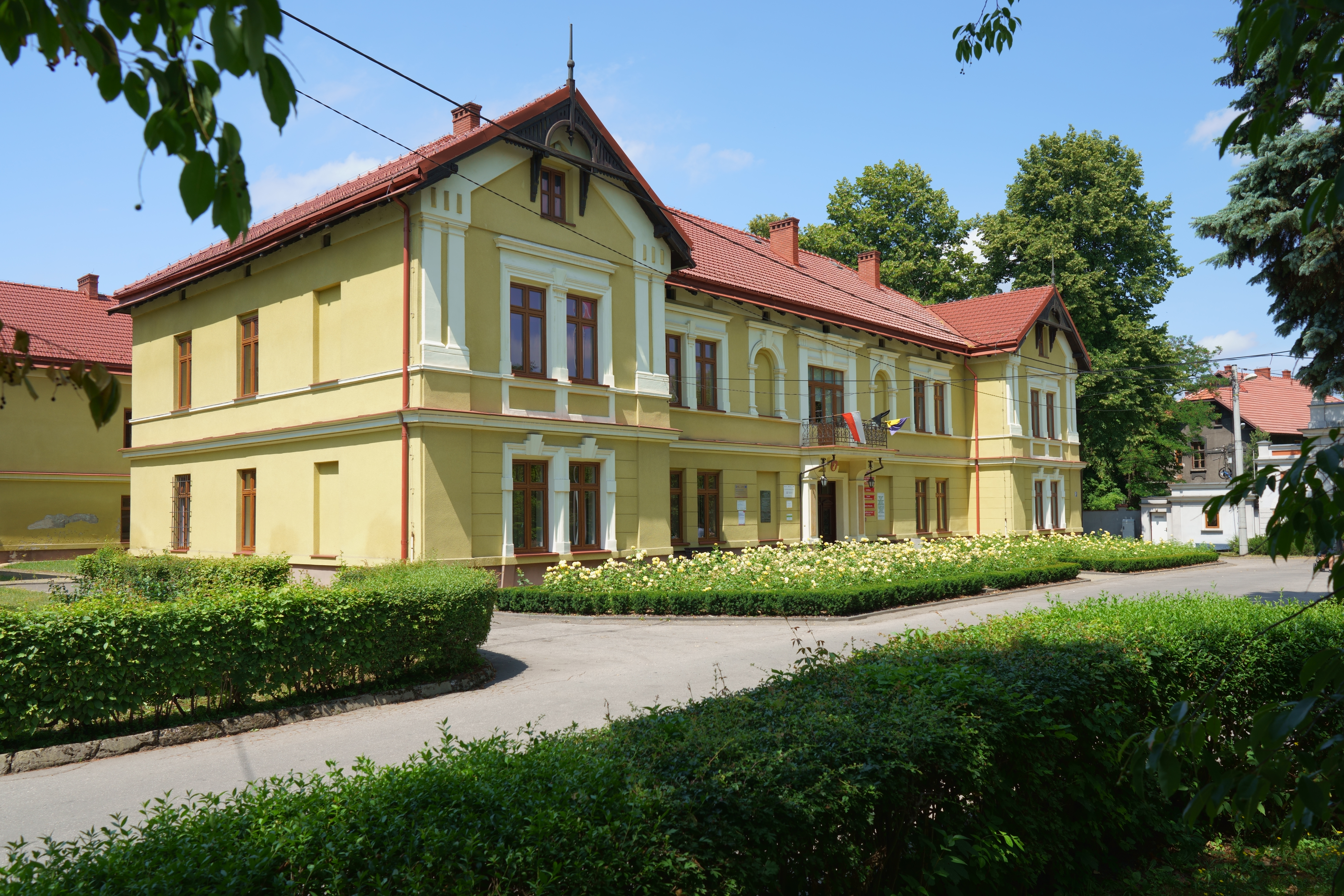
- Manor house

- Location within Poland
- Coordinates: 49°59′17″N 19°40′27″E
- Country: Poland
- Voivodeship: Lesser Poland
- County: Kraków
- Gmina: Czernichów
- Elevation: 206.3 m (677 ft)

Population
  - Total: 1,700

Czernichów [t͡ʂɛrˈnixuf] is a village in Kraków County, Lesser Poland Voivodeship, in southern Poland. It is the seat of the gmina (administrative district) called Gmina Czernichów.
