= Yagoda =

Yagoda (Russian: Ягода) is a Russian surname meaning "berry". However, there is a change in stress and thus pronunciation—the Russian surname is stressed Яго́да, and the word for "berry" is я́года. It also may be a Russian version of the name Yaguda/Yehuda (Judah).

Notable people with the surname include:

- Genrikh Yagoda (1891–1938), Soviet state security official
- Ben Yagoda (born 1954), American professor of journalism
- Myroslav Yagoda (1957–2018), Ukrainian artist
- Marvin Yagoda (1938-2017), founder of Marvin's Marvelous Mechanical Museum

== See also ==
- Jagoda
- Jahoda
