= Tarnowo =

Tarnowo may refer to the following places:

- Tarnowo, Oborniki County in Greater Poland Voivodeship (west-central Poland)
- Tarnowo, Piła County in Greater Poland Voivodeship (west-central Poland)
- Tarnowo, Podlaskie Voivodeship (north-east Poland)
- Tarnowo, Poznań County in Greater Poland Voivodeship (west-central Poland)
- Tarnowo, Goleniów County in West Pomeranian Voivodeship (north-west Poland)
- Tarnowo, Łobez County in West Pomeranian Voivodeship (north-west Poland)
- Tarnowo, Myślibórz County in West Pomeranian Voivodeship (north-west Poland)
- Tarnowo, Stargard County in West Pomeranian Voivodeship (north-west Poland)
