= Kamień, Lesser Poland Voivodeship =

Kamień
- Village
- Location within Poland
- Coordinates: 50°0′57″N 19°35′14″E
- Country: Poland
- Voivodeship: Lesser Poland
- County: Kraków
- Gmina: Czernichów
- Population: 1,300

Kamień (Polish pronunciation: [ˈkamjɛj̃]) is a village in the administrative district of Gmina Czernichów, within Kraków County, Lesser Poland Voivodeship, in southern Poland.
