= Jagodno =

Jagodno may refer to the following places:

- Jagodno, Greater Poland Voivodeship (west-central Poland)
- Jagodno, Lublin Voivodeship (east Poland)
- Jagodno, Masovian Voivodeship (east-central Poland)
- Jagodno, Warmian-Masurian Voivodeship (north Poland)
- Jagodno, Wrocław (south-western Poland)
- Jagodno, Croatia, a village near Velika Gorica, Croatia
