= Brzeźno, Poznań County =

Brzeźno
- Village
- Location within Poland
- Coordinates: 52°22′33″N 17°20′36″E
- Country: Poland
- Voivodeship: Greater Poland
- County: Poznań
- Gmina: Kostrzyn

Brzeźno [ˈbʐɛʑnɔ] is a village in the administrative district of Gmina Kostrzyn, within Poznań County, Greater Poland Voivodeship, in west-central Poland.
