= Kostrzyn, Greater Poland Voivodeship =

Kostrzyn
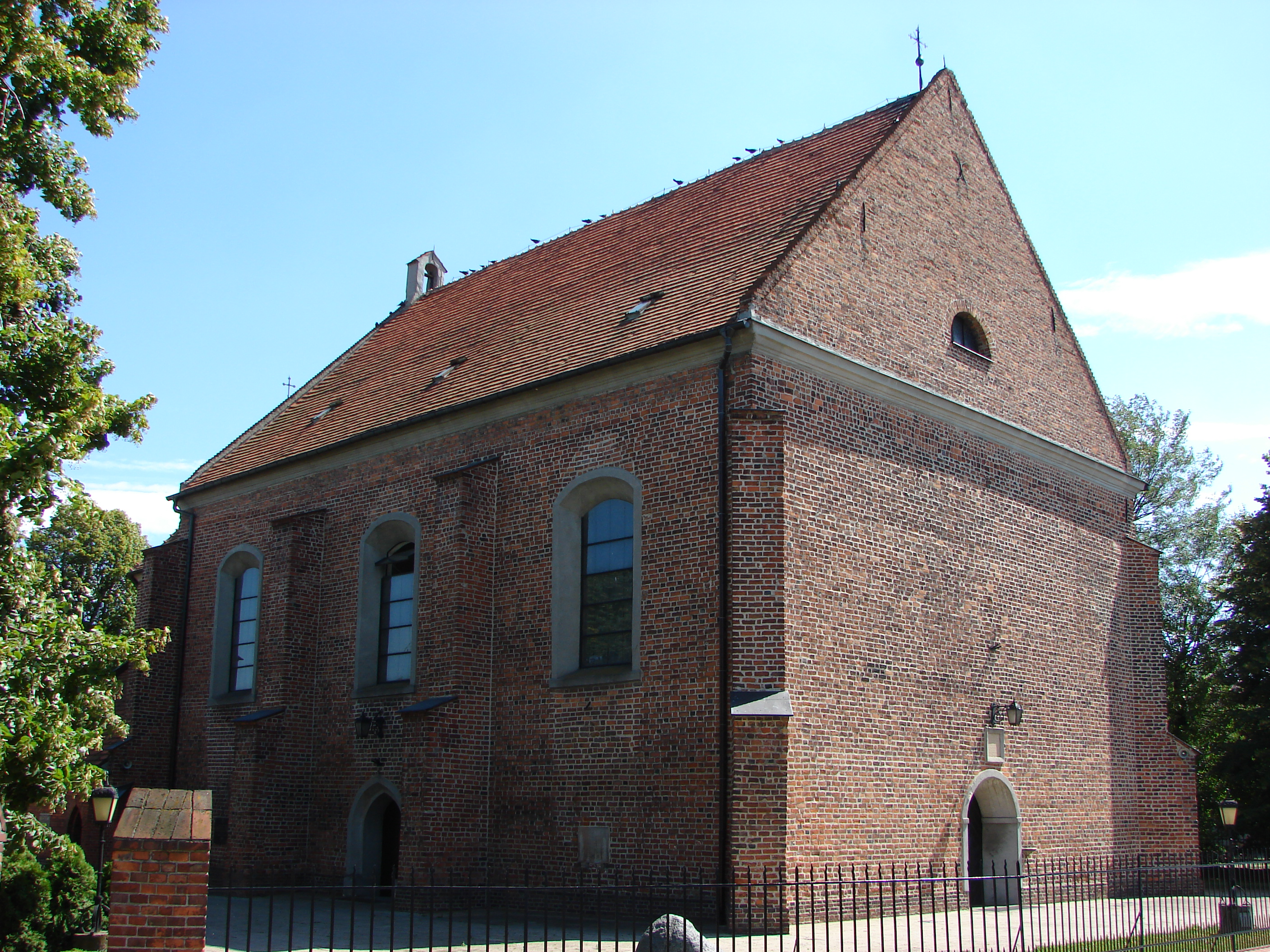
- Church of Saints Peter and Paul, first half of the 16th century.

- Coat of arms

- Location within Poland
- Coordinates: 52°23′39″N 17°13′20″E
- Country: Poland
- Voivodeship: Greater Poland
- County: Poznań
- Gmina: Kostrzyn

Area
  - Total: 8.03 km^{2} (3.10 sq mi)

Population (2010)
  - Total: 9,041
  - Density: 1,130/km^{2} (2,920/sq mi)
- Time zone: UTC+1 (CET)
  - Summer (DST): UTC+2 (CEST)
- Postal code: 62-025
- Vehicle registration: POZ, PZ
- Climate: Cfb
- Primary airport: Poznań–Ławica Airport
- Website: http://www.kostrzyn.wlkp.pl/

Kostrzyn [ˈkɔstʂɨn] is a town in west-central Poland, seat of Gmina Kostrzyn in the Poznań County in the Greater Poland Voivodeship, with 9,041 inhabitants (2010).

== History ==
As part of the region of Greater Poland, i.e. the cradle of the Polish state, the area formed part of Poland since its establishment in the 10th century. It was a private church town, administratively located in the Poznań County in the Poznań Voivodeship in the Greater Poland Province. In the Second Partition of Poland, in 1793, it was annexed by Prussia. After the successful Greater Poland uprising of 1806, it was regained by Poles and included within the short-lived Polish Duchy of Warsaw. Following the duchy's dissolution in 1815, it was reannexed by Prussia, and from 1871 it was also part of Germany. The populace was subjected to Germanisation policies.

Following World War I, in 1918, Poland regained independence and the Greater Poland uprising against Germany broke out, which goal was to reintegrate the town and region with reborn Poland. The town formed a company of one hundred insurgents and a platoon of nearly forty, of whom eleven were killed in the uprising. Kostrzyn was reintegrated with Poland.

=== World War II ===
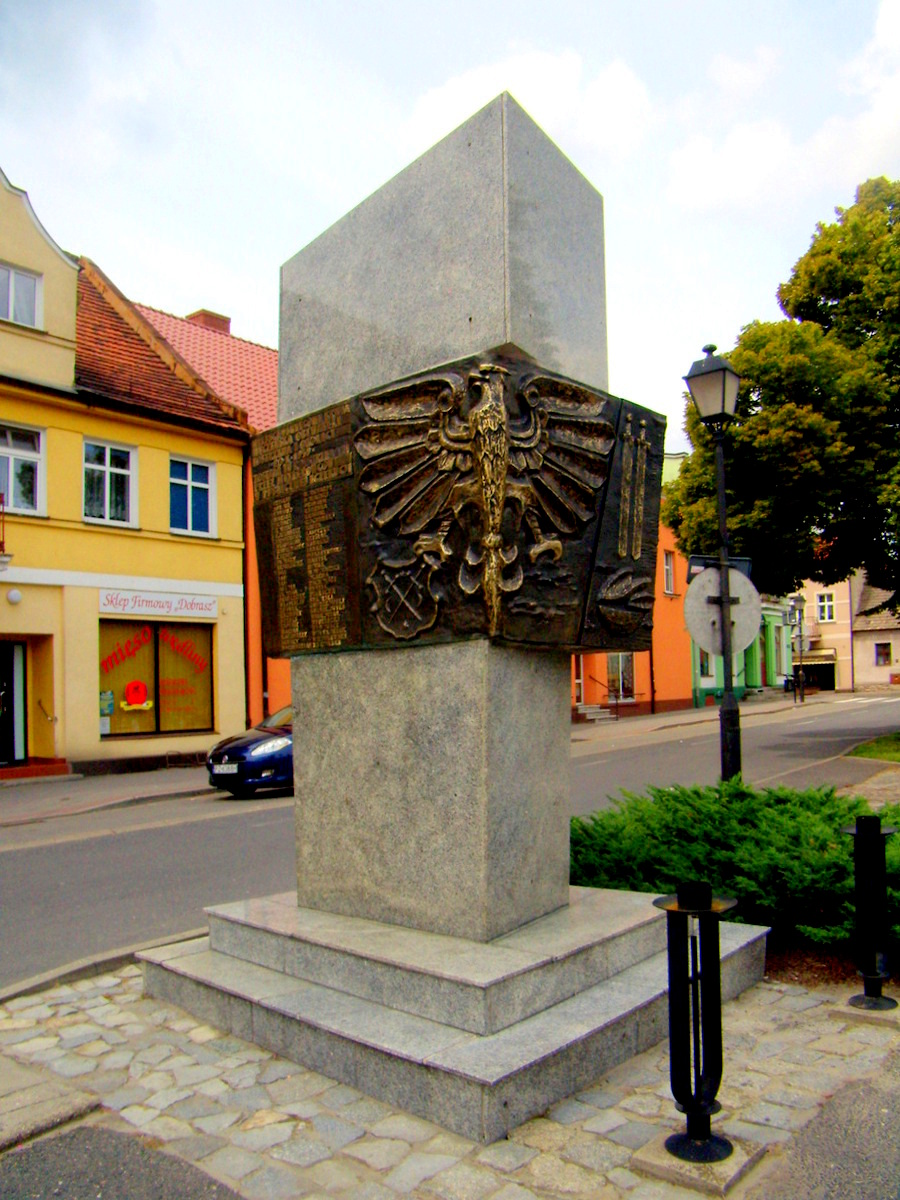
Memorial at the site of the German massacre of Poles committed on October 20, 1939

At the start of World War II, the town was invaded by Germany on September 10, 1939. In the following days, the Germans carried out firsts arrests, beatings, tortures and murders of local Poles. On September 16, a detachment of Einsatzkommando 14 entered Kostrzyn, then gathered all the Polish men at the Market Square and carried out beatings and selection of 100 prisoners, who were eventually sent on foot to a newly established camp in Swarzędz. That day and in the days that followed, the Germans carried out further murders of local Poles. On October 20, 1939, the Germans carried out a public execution of 28 Poles, including teachers, school principals, merchants, craftsmen, etc. It was one of many massacres of Poles committed by Germany on October 20–23 across the region in attempt to pacify and terrorize the Polish population. In November 1939, the Hilfspolizei carried out further murders of local Poles.

In late 1939, the German police carried out first expulsions of Poles, mainly families of Poles who were murdered or deported to concentration camps during the Intelligenzaktion, plus owners of workshops and better houses. Expelled Poles were deported to the General Government in the more eastern part of German-occupied Poland. Most of the Germans responsible for the crimes against Poles in Kostrzyn fled the town before the approaching Eastern Front and escaped justice.

== Demographics ==
Historical population

Year	Pop.	±%
1871	2,039	—
1880	2,090	+2.5%
1890	2,117	+1.3%
1900	2,339	+10.5%
1910	3,230	+38.1%
1921	3,077	−4.7%

Year	Pop.	±%
1931	3,370	+9.5%
1939	3,706	+10.0%
1950	3,340	−9.9%
1960	4,404	+31.9%
2010	9,041	+105.3%

== Economy ==
The supermarket chain Biedronka is headquartered in Kostrzyn.

== Transport ==
Kosztryn is bypassed by the S5 expressway to the east. Kostrzyn and Strumiany exits provide access to the town.

National road 92 passes to the north of the town.

Kostrzyn has a station on the Poznań-Warsaw railway line.

The nearest airport to Kostrzyn is Poznań-Ławica Airport.
