= Bednarze, Lesser Poland Voivodeship =

Bednarze
- Village
- Location within Poland
- Coordinates: 50°3′20″N 19°38′28″E
- Country: Poland
- Voivodeship: Lesser Poland
- County: Kraków
- Gmina: Czernichów

Bednarze [bɛdˈnaʐɛ] is a village in the administrative district of Gmina Czernichów, within Kraków County, Lesser Poland Voivodeship, in southern Poland.
