= Rusocice, Lesser Poland Voivodeship =

Rusocice
- Village
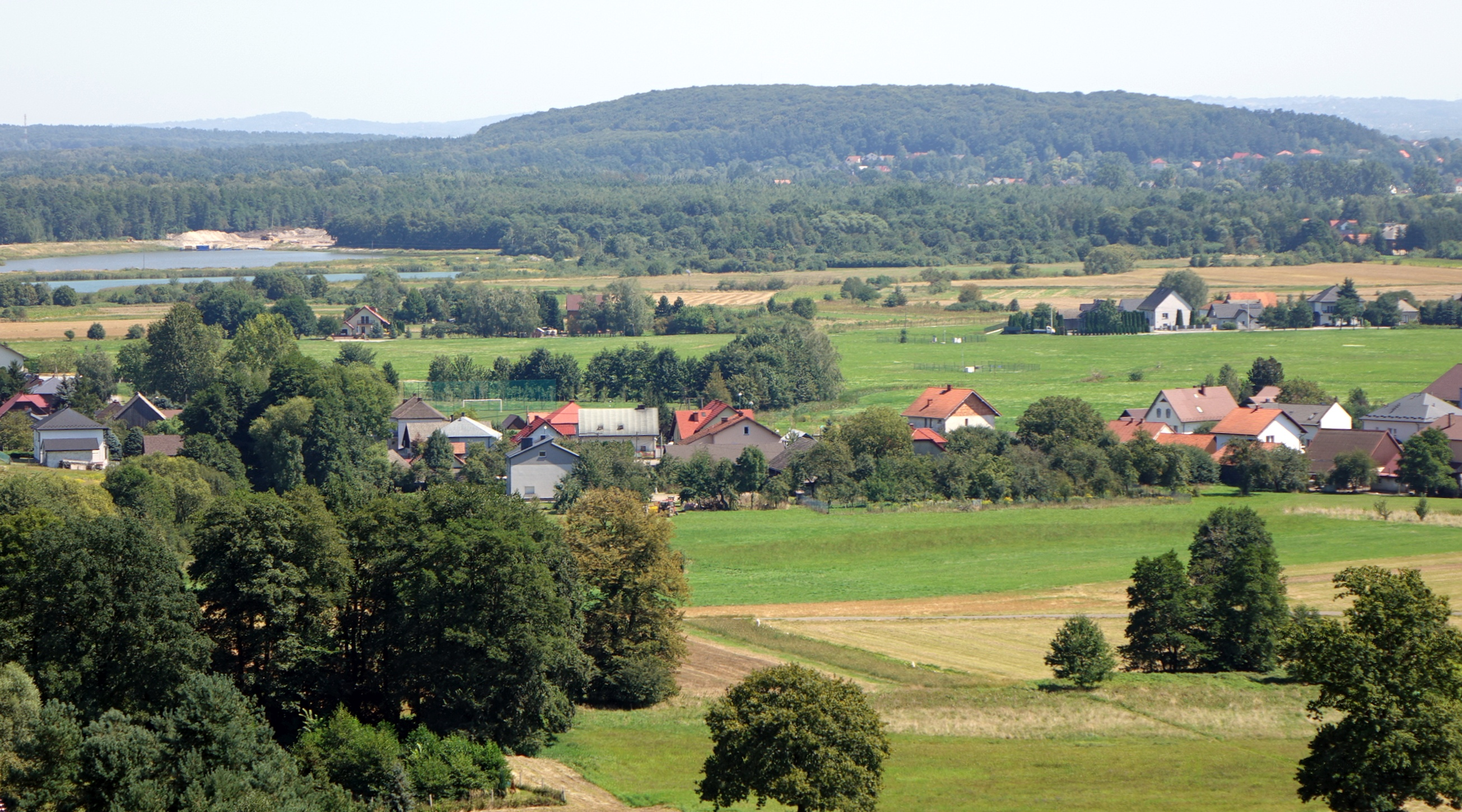

- Location within Poland
- Coordinates: 50°0′N 19°37′E
- Country: Poland
- Voivodeship: Lesser Poland
- County: Kraków
- Gmina: Czernichów
- Time zone: UTC+1 (CET)
  - Summer (DST): UTC+2 (CEST)
- Vehicle registration: KRA

Rusocice [rusɔˈt͡ɕit͡sɛ] is a village in the administrative district of Gmina Czernichów, within Kraków County, Lesser Poland Voivodeship, in southern Poland.
