= Buszkówiec =

- Settlement
- Location within Poland
- Coordinates: 52°25′22″N 17°15′55″E
- Country: Poland
- Voivodeship: Greater Poland
- County: Poznań
- Gmina: Kostrzyn

Buszkówiec [buʂˈkuvjɛt͡s] is a settlement in the administrative district of Gmina Kostrzyn, within Poznań County, Greater Poland Voivodeship, in west-central Poland.
