= Wróblewo, Poznań County =

Wróblewo
- Village
- Location within Poland
- Coordinates: 52°40′03″N 16°18′32″E
- Country: Poland
- Voivodeship: Greater Poland
- County: Poznań
- Gmina: Kostrzyn

Wróblewo [vruˈblɛvɔ] is a village in the administrative district of Gmina Kostrzyn, within Poznań County, Greater Poland Voivodeship, in west-central Poland.
