= Siekierki Wielkie =

- Village
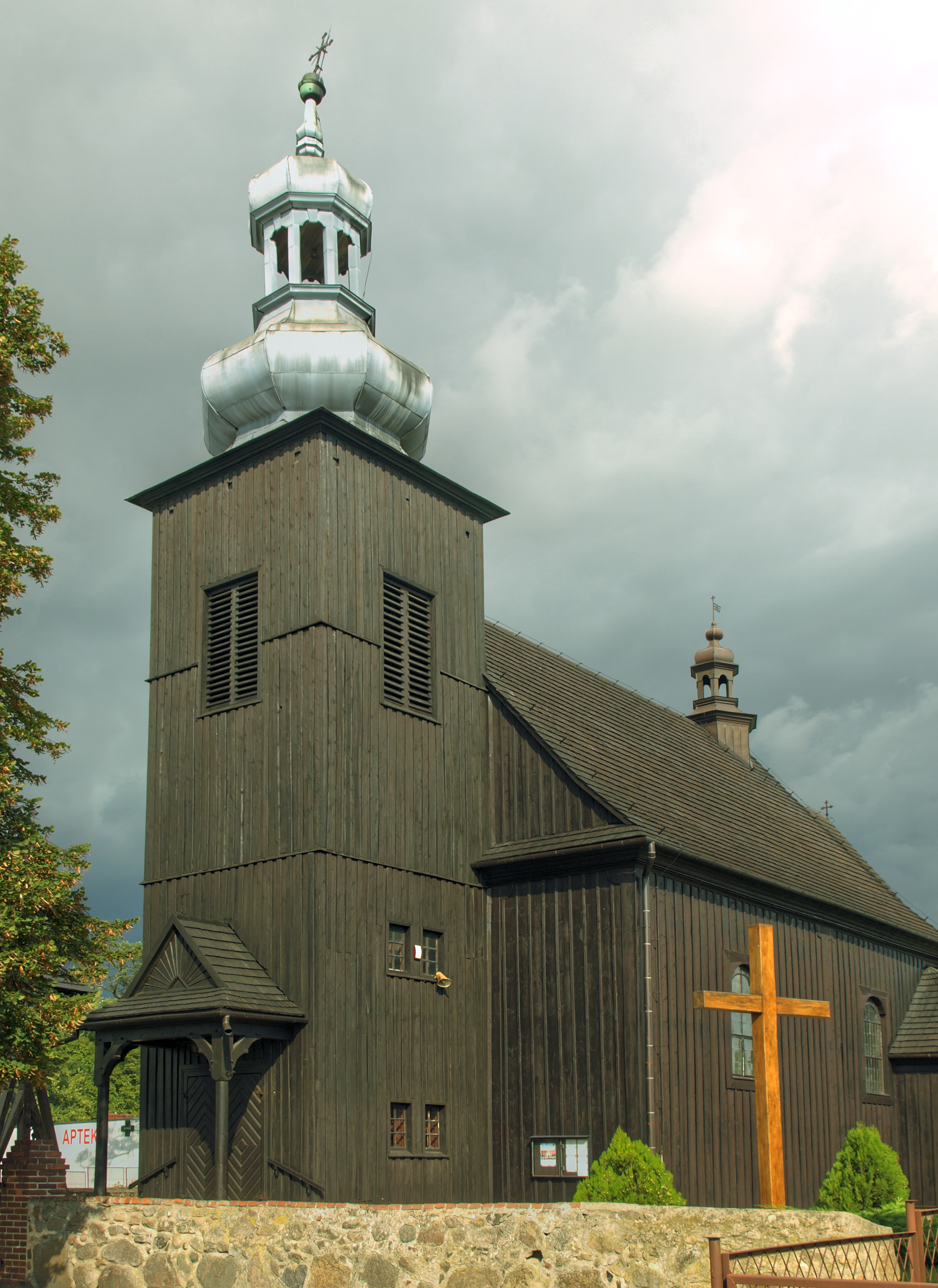

- Location within Poland
- Coordinates: 52°23′N 17°10′E
- Country: Poland
- Voivodeship: Greater Poland
- County: Poznań
- Gmina: Kostrzyn

Siekierki Wielkie [ɕɛˈkʲɛrki ˈvjɛlkʲɛ] is a village in the administrative district of Gmina Kostrzyn, within Poznań County, Greater Poland Voivodeship, in west-central Poland.
