= Chorzałki =

- Settlement
- Location within Poland
- Coordinates: 52°25′07″N 17°17′14″E
- Country: Poland
- Voivodeship: Greater Poland
- County: Poznań
- Gmina: Kostrzyn

Chorzałki [xɔˈʐau̯ki] is a settlement in the administrative district of Gmina Kostrzyn, within Poznań County, Greater Poland Voivodeship, in west-central Poland.
