= Gmina Czernichów, Lesser Poland Voivodeship =

Gmina Czernichów Czernichów Commune
- Gmina
- Flag Coat of arms
- Interactive map of Gmina Czernichów
- Coordinates (Czernichów): 49°59′17″N 19°40′27″E
- Country: Poland
- Voivodeship: Lesser Poland
- County: Kraków County
- Seat: Czernichów

Area
  - Total: 83.8 km^{2} (32.4 sq mi)

Population (2006)
  - Total: 12,851
  - Density: 153/km^{2} (397/sq mi)
- Website: http://www.czernichow.pl

Gmina Czernichów is a rural gmina (administrative district) in Kraków County, Lesser Poland Voivodeship, in southern Poland. Its seat is the village of Czernichów, which lies approximately 21 kilometres (13 mi) south-west of the regional capital Kraków.

The gmina covers an area of 83.8 square kilometres (32.4 sq mi), and as of 2006 its total population is 12,851.

Gmina Czernichów is located on the Vistula river, among limestone and hillocks covered with forests. It includes parts of the protected areas called Bielany-Tyniec Landscape Park and Rudawy Landscape Park. There is also a nature park, "Kajasówka", which is an excellent example of steppes in the landscape.

== Villages ==
Gmina Czernichów contains the villages of Bednarze, Czernichów, Czułówek, Dąbrowa Szlachecka, Kamień, Kłokoczyn, Nowa Wieś Szlachecka, Przeginia Duchowna, Przeginia Narodowa, Ratanice, Rusocice, Rybna, Wołowice and Zagacie.

== Neighbouring gminas ==
Gmina Czernichów is bordered by the gminas of Alwernia, Brzeźnica, Krzeszowice, Liszki, Skawina and Spytkowice.
