= Węgierskie, Greater Poland Voivodeship =

Węgierskie
- Village
- Location within Poland
- Coordinates: 52°19′N 17°15′E
- Country: Poland
- Voivodeship: Greater Poland
- County: Poznań
- Gmina: Kostrzyn
- Elevation: 100 m (330 ft)
- Population: 210

Węgierskie [vɛnˈɡʲɛrskʲɛ] is a village in the administrative district of Gmina Kostrzyn, within Poznań County, Greater Poland Voivodeship, in west-central Poland.

== History ==
Village Węgierskie (spelled as Wengierskie, Vegierskie, Wangerske, Vagerske) was started by prisoners of war from Hungary. Mentioned in sources from year of 1371. Initially belonged to Węgierski family – they inherited the estate in the beginning of the 17th century, Malczewski family (18th century) and Bronikowska (1843). Later estate in German hands. In 1890 taken by Credit Bank in Szczecin. Later taken over by Ziołecki family. In second part of the 19th century initially storied manor was built. Expanded in the beginning of the 20th century and alluded to neo-renaissance style.
