= Gułtowy =

- Village
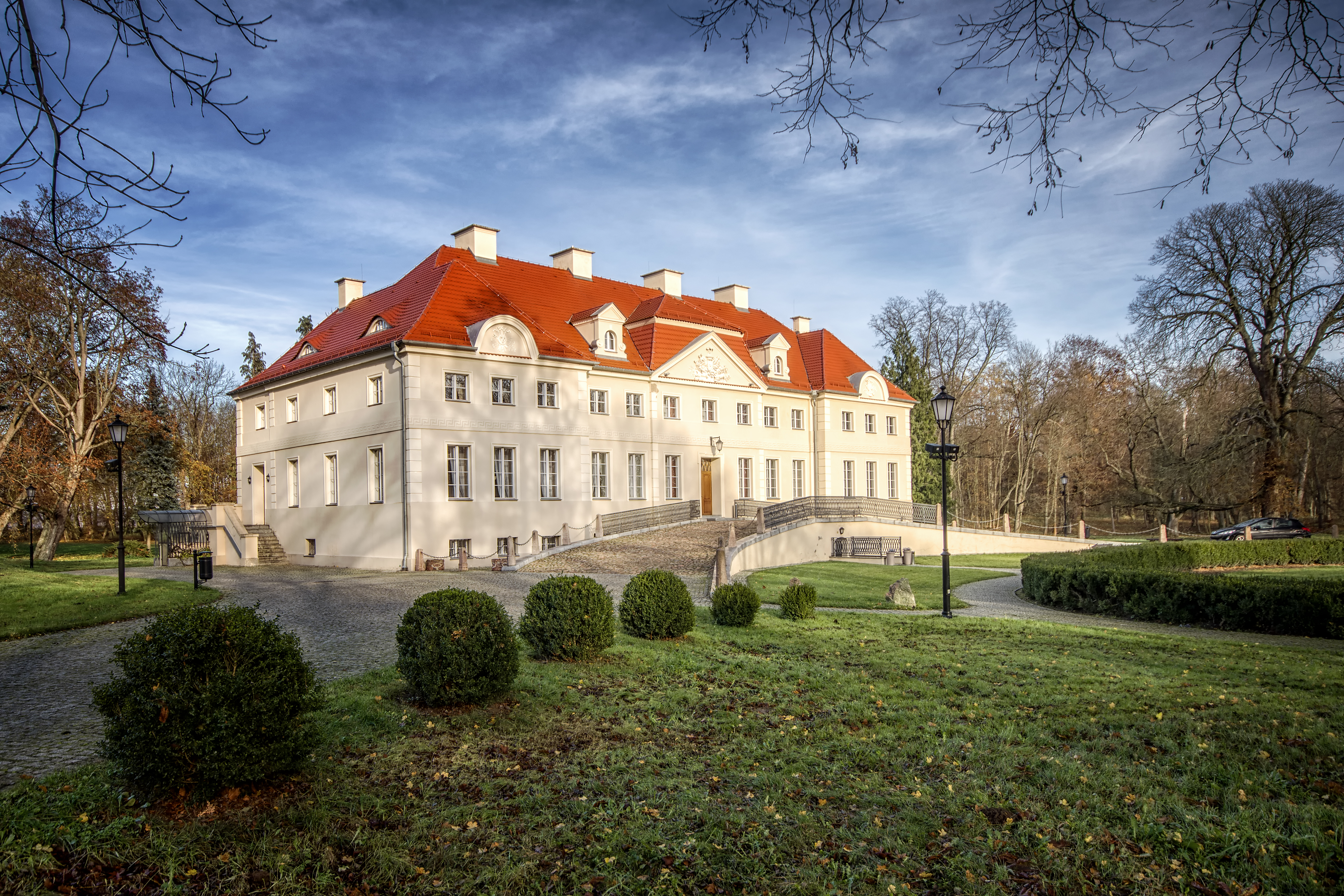
- The palace.

- Location within Poland
- Coordinates: 52°21′N 17°20′E
- Country: Poland
- Voivodeship: Greater Poland
- County: Poznań
- Gmina: Kostrzyn
- Population: 1,490

Gułtowy [ɡuu̯ˈtɔvɨ] is a village in the administrative district of Gmina Kostrzyn, within Poznań County, Greater Poland Voivodeship, in west-central Poland.
