= Czułówek =

- Village
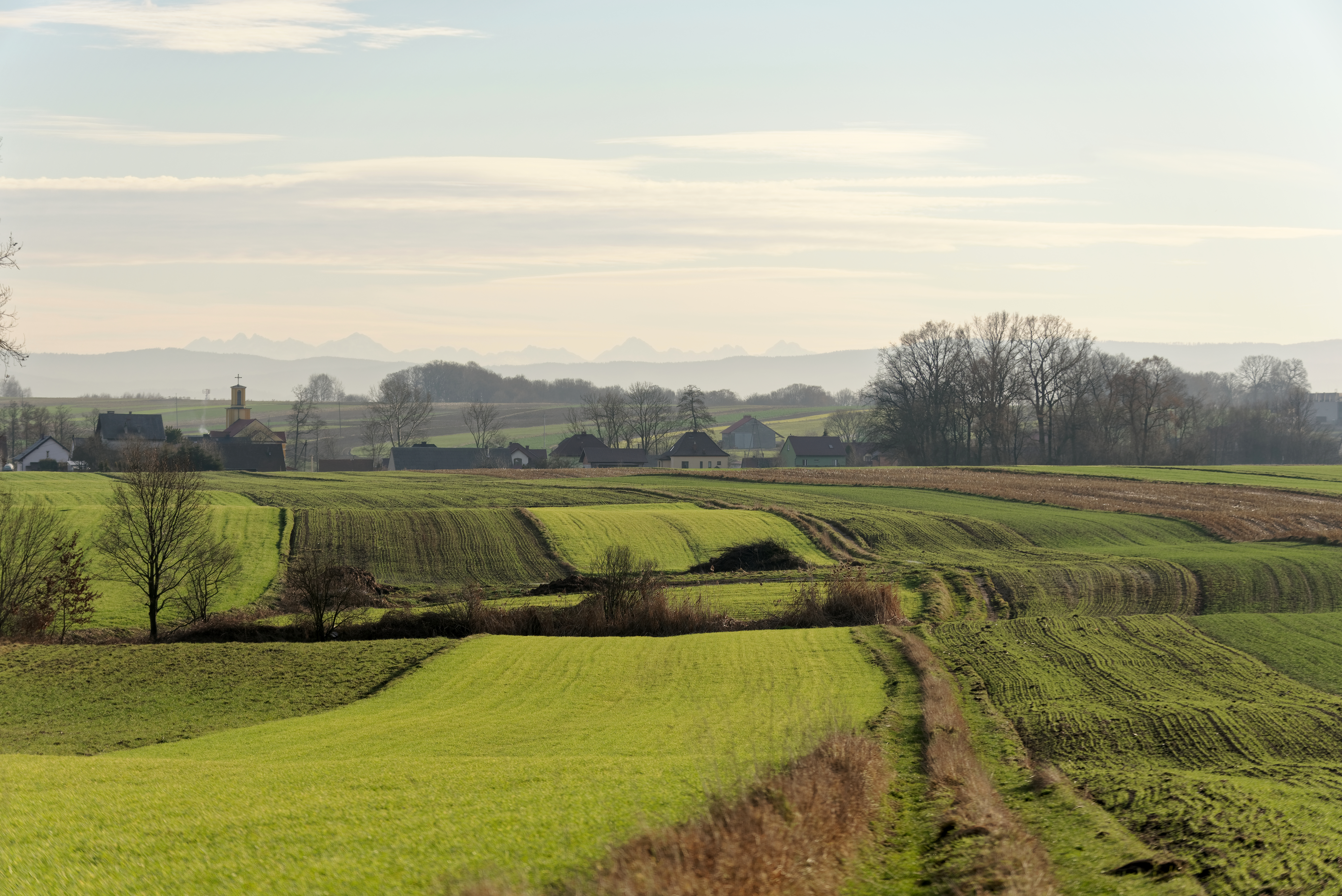

- Location within Poland
- Coordinates: 50°3′N 19°41′E
- Country: Poland
- Voivodeship: Lesser Poland
- County: Kraków
- Gmina: Czernichów
- Population: 420

Czułówek [t͡ʂuˈwuvɛk] is a village in the administrative district of Gmina Czernichów, within Kraków County, Lesser Poland Voivodeship, in southern Poland.
