= Antonin, Poznań County =

Antonin
- Village
- Location within Poland
- Coordinates: 52°22′15″N 17°19′8″E
- Country: Poland
- Voivodeship: Greater Poland
- County: Poznań
- Gmina: Kostrzyn

Antonin (Polish pronunciation: [anˈtɔɲin]) is a village in the administrative district of Gmina Kostrzyn, within Poznań County, Greater Poland Voivodeship, in west-central Poland.
