= Skałowo =

- Village
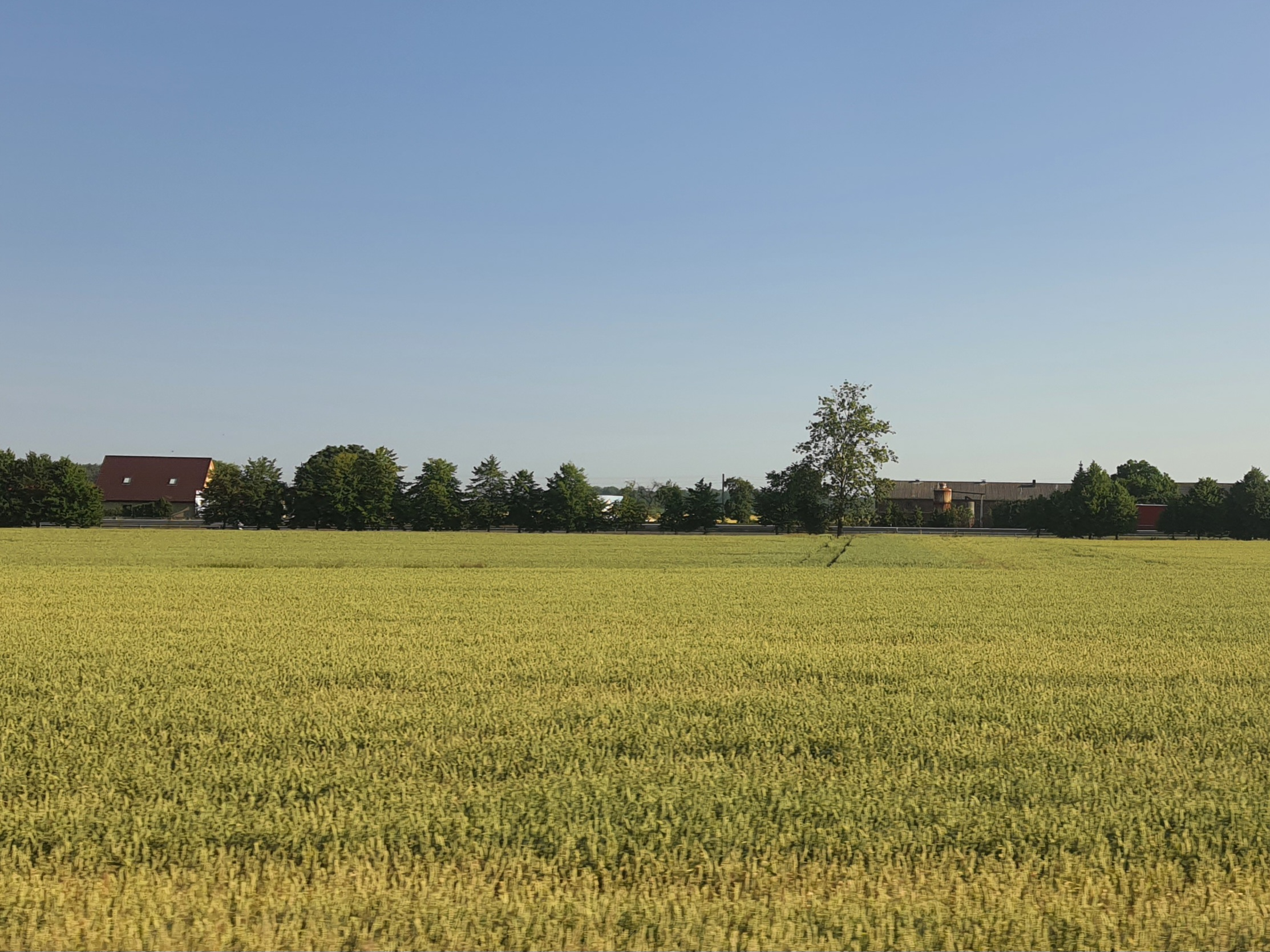

- Location within Poland
- Coordinates: 52°23′51″N 17°11′33″E
- Country: Poland
- Voivodeship: Greater Poland
- County: Poznań
- Gmina: Kostrzyn

Skałowo [skaˈwɔvɔ] is a village in the administrative district of Gmina Kostrzyn, within Poznań County, Greater Poland Voivodeship, in west-central Poland.
