= Gmina Kostrzyn =

Gmina Kostrzyn Kostrzyn Commune
- Gmina
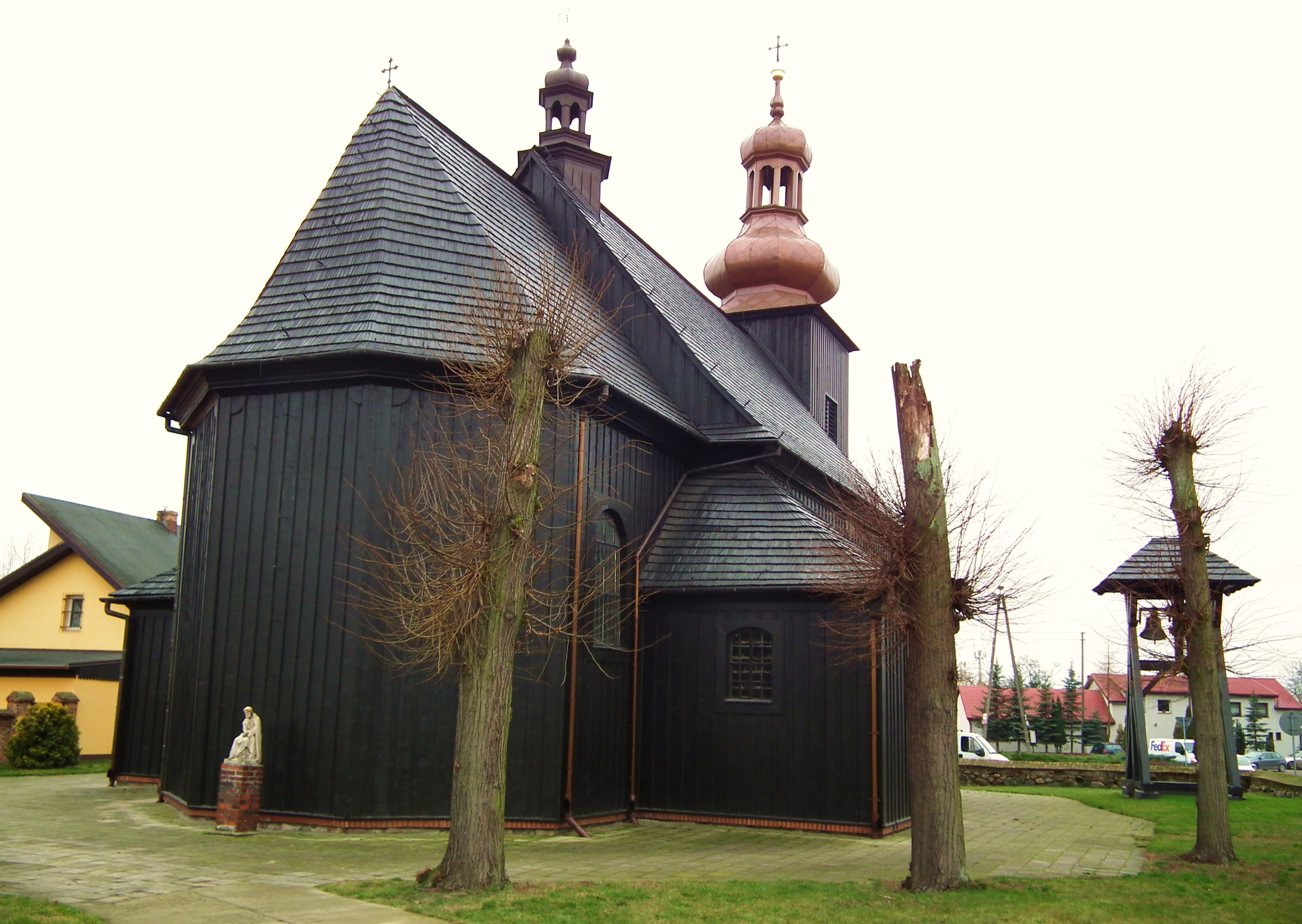

- Coat of arms
- Interactive map of Gmina Kostrzyn
- Coordinates (Kostrzyn): 52°23′39″N 17°13′20″E
- Country: Poland
- Voivodeship: Greater Poland
- County: Poznań County
- Seat: Kostrzyn

Area
  - Total: 154 km^{2} (59 sq mi)

Population (2006)
  - Total: 15,456
  - Density: 100/km^{2} (260/sq mi)
  - Urban: 8,539
  - Rural: 6,917

Gmina Kostrzyn is an urban-rural gmina (administrative district) in Poznań County, Greater Poland Voivodeship, in west-central Poland. Its seat is the town of Kostrzyn, which lies approximately 21 kilometres (13 mi) east of the regional capital Poznań.

The gmina covers an area of 154 square kilometres (59.5 sq mi), and as of 2006 its total population is 15,456 (out of which the population of Kostrzyn amounts to 8,539, and the population of the rural part of the gmina is 6,917).

== Villages ==
Apart from the town of Kostrzyn, Gmina Kostrzyn contains the villages and settlements of Antonin, Brzeźno, Buszkówiec, Chorzałki, Czerlejnko, Czerlejno, Drzązgowo, Glinka Duchowna, Glinka Szlachecka, Gułtowy, Gwiazdowo, Iwno, Jagodno, Klony, Leśna Grobla, Libartowo, Ługowiny, Rujsca, Sanniki, Siedlec, Siedleczek, Siekierki Małe, Siekierki Wielkie, Skałowo, Sokolniki Drzązgowskie, Sokolniki Klonowskie, Strumiany, Tarnowo, Trzek, Węgierskie, Wiktorowo and Wróblewo.

== Neighbouring gminas ==
Gmina Kostrzyn is bordered by the gminas of Dominowo, Kleszczewo, Nekla, Pobiedziska, Środa Wielkopolska and Swarzędz.
