= Siedleczek =

- Village
- Location within Poland
- Coordinates: 52°24′N 17°21′E
- Country: Poland
- Voivodeship: Greater Poland
- County: Poznań
- Gmina: Kostrzyn

Siedleczek [ɕɛˈdlɛt͡ʂɛk] is a village in the administrative district of Gmina Kostrzyn, within Poznań County, Greater Poland Voivodeship, in west-central Poland.
