= Kłokoczyn, Lesser Poland Voivodeship =

Kłokoczyn
- Village
- Location within Poland
- Coordinates: 49°59′42″N 19°38′18″E
- Country: Poland
- Voivodeship: Lesser Poland
- County: Kraków
- Gmina: Czernichów
- Population: 408

Kłokoczyn [kwɔˈkɔt͡ʂɨn] is a village in the administrative district of Gmina Czernichów, within Kraków County, Lesser Poland Voivodeship, in southern Poland.
