= Drzązgowo, Poznań County =

Drzązgowo
- Village
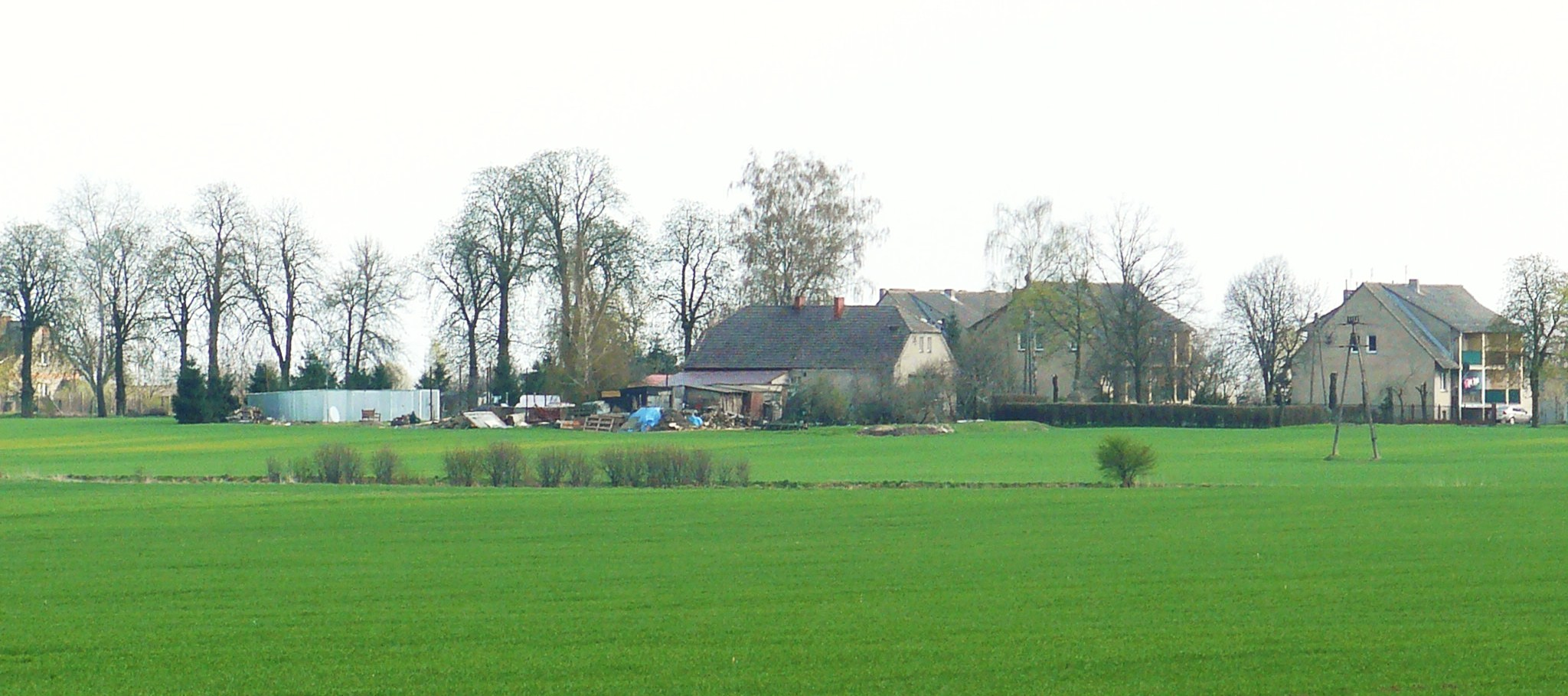

- Location within Poland
- Coordinates: 52°20′N 17°18′E
- Country: Poland
- Voivodeship: Greater Poland
- County: Poznań
- Gmina: Kostrzyn
- Population: 260

Drzązgowo [dʐɔ̃zˈɡɔvɔ] is a village in the administrative district of Gmina Kostrzyn, within Poznań County, Greater Poland Voivodeship, in west-central Poland.
