= Czerlejnko =

- Village
- Location within Poland
- Coordinates: 52°21′49″N 17°13′20″E
- Country: Poland
- Voivodeship: Greater Poland
- County: Poznań
- Gmina: Kostrzyn

Czerlejnko [t͡ʂɛrˈlɛi̯nkɔ] is a village in the administrative district of Gmina Kostrzyn, within Poznań County, Greater Poland Voivodeship, in west-central Poland.
