= Ratanice =

- Village
- Location within Poland
- Coordinates: 49°59′44″N 19°39′31″E
- Country: Poland
- Voivodeship: Lesser Poland
- County: Kraków
- Gmina: Czernichów

Ratanice [rataˈnit͡sɛ] is a village in the administrative district of Gmina Czernichów, within Kraków County, Lesser Poland Voivodeship, in southern Poland.
