= Siedlec, Poznań County =

Siedlec
- Village
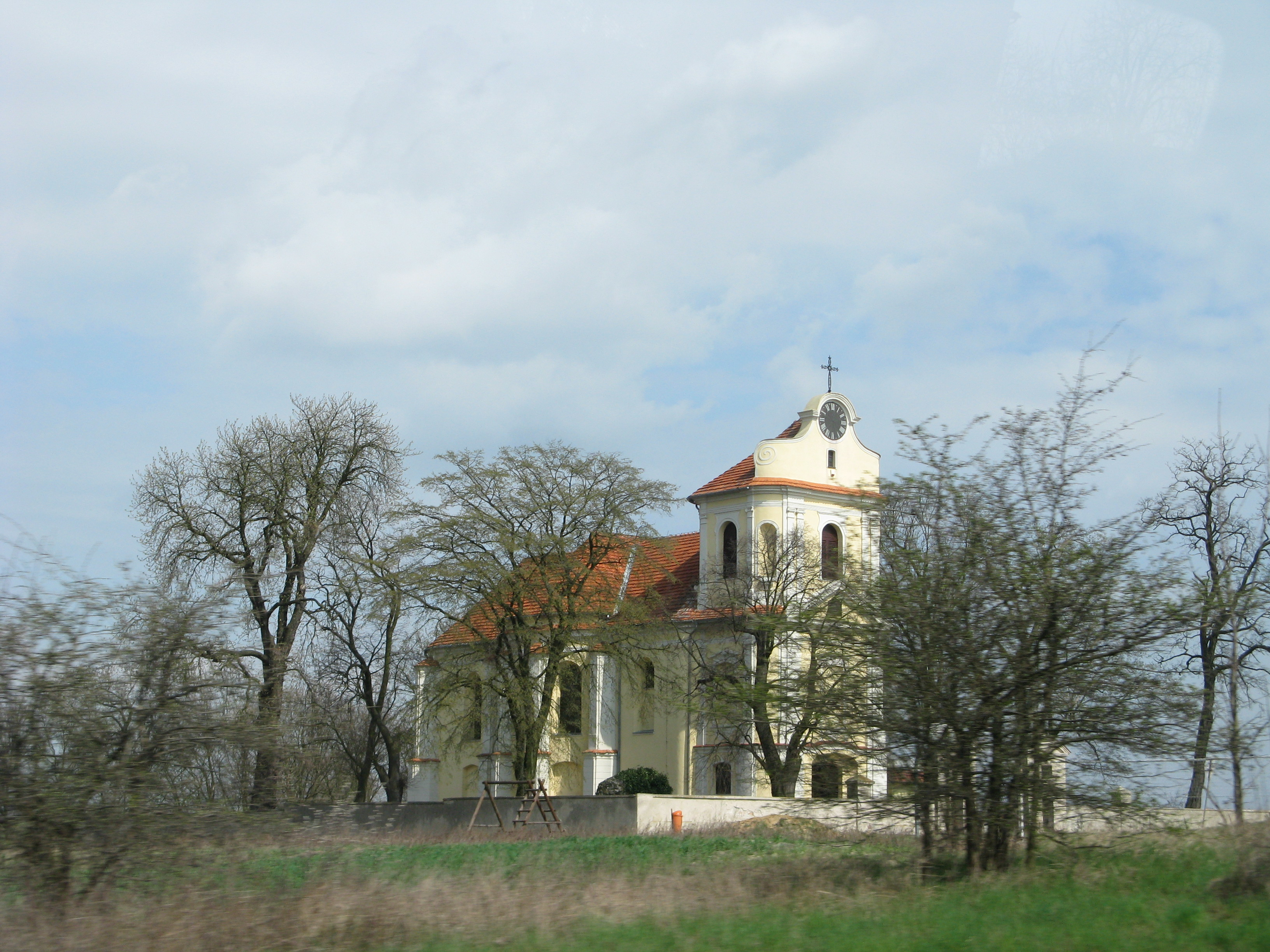
- Saint Nicholas Church

- Location within Poland
- Coordinates: 52°23′N 17°18′E
- Country: Poland
- Voivodeship: Greater Poland
- County: Poznań
- Gmina: Kostrzyn
- Population: 460

Siedlec [ˈɕɛdlɛt͡s] is a village in the administrative district of Gmina Kostrzyn, within Poznań County, Greater Poland Voivodeship, in west-central Poland.
