= Trzek =

- Village
- Location within Poland
- Coordinates: 52°21′N 17°10′E
- Country: Poland
- Voivodeship: Greater Poland
- County: Poznań
- Gmina: Kostrzyn

Trzek [tʂɛk] is a village in the administrative district of Gmina Kostrzyn, within Poznań County, Greater Poland Voivodeship, in west-central Poland.
