= Tarnov =

Tarnov can be:

- Tarnov, Bardejov, a village in Slovakia
- Tarnów, Poland, anglicized as Tarnov
- Tarnov, Nebraska, named after the Polish town from which many of the original inhabitants came
