= Dąbrowa Szlachecka =

- Village
- Location within Poland
- Coordinates: 50°0′N 19°46′E
- Country: Poland
- Voivodeship: Lesser Poland
- County: Kraków
- Gmina: Czernichów
- Population: 621

Dąbrowa Szlachecka [dɔmˈbrɔva ʂlaˈxɛt͡ska] is a village in the administrative district of Gmina Czernichów, within Kraków County, Lesser Poland Voivodeship, in southern Poland.
