= Glinka Szlachecka =

- Village
- Location within Poland
- Coordinates: 52°25′34″N 17°15′19″E
- Country: Poland
- Voivodeship: Greater Poland
- County: Poznań
- Gmina: Kostrzyn

Glinka Szlachecka [ˈɡlinka ʂlaˈxɛt͡ska] is a village in the administrative district of Gmina Kostrzyn, within Poznań County, Greater Poland Voivodeship, in west-central Poland.
