= Nowa Wieś Szlachecka =

- Village
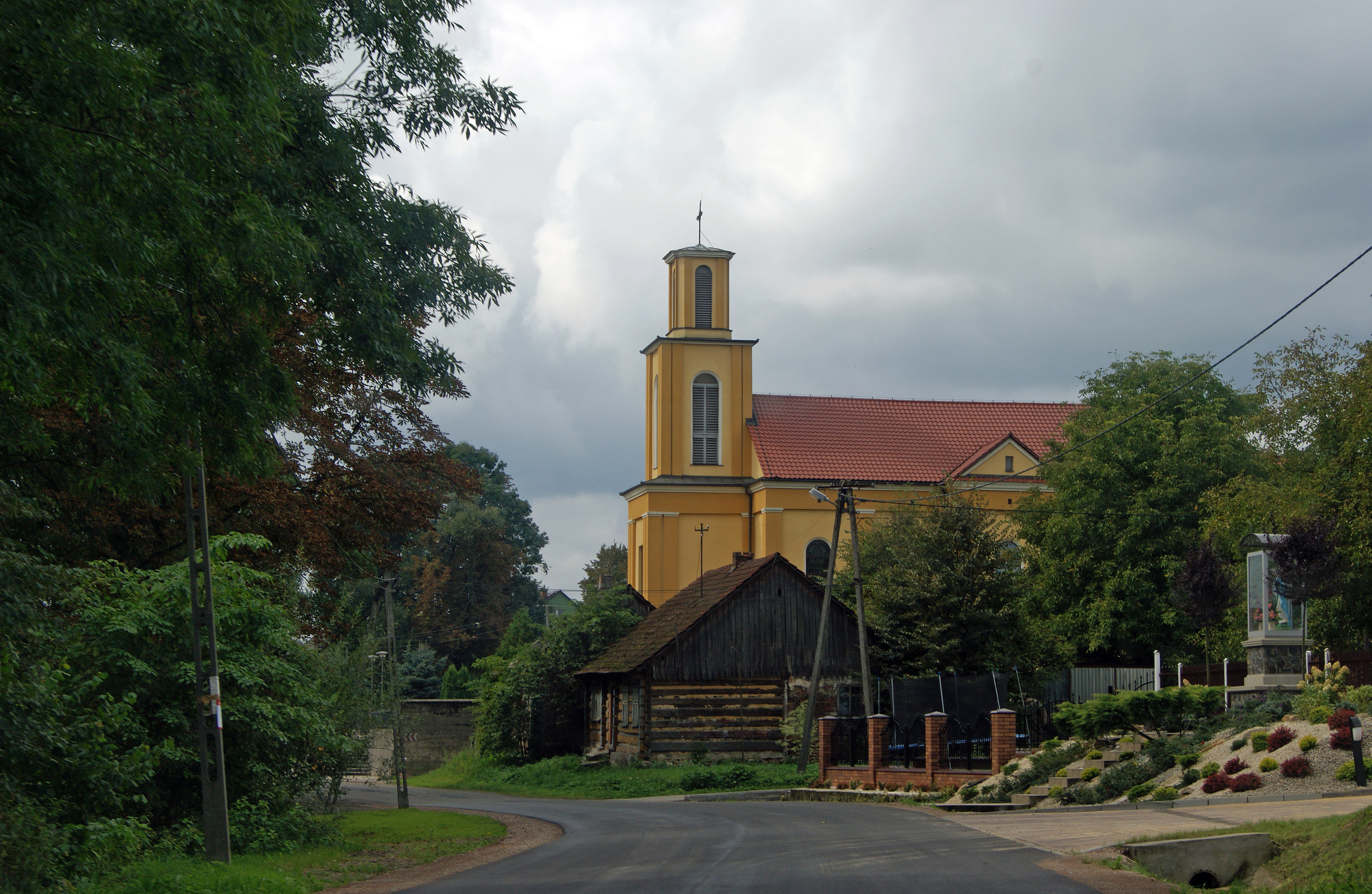
- Church of the Virgin Mary

- Location within Poland
- Coordinates: 50°1′40″N 19°41′54″E
- Country: Poland
- Voivodeship: Lesser Poland
- County: Kraków
- Gmina: Czernichów

Nowa Wieś Szlachecka [ˈnɔva ˈvjɛɕ ʂlaˈxɛt͡ska] is a village in the administrative district of Gmina Czernichów, within Kraków County, Lesser Poland Voivodeship, in southern Poland.
