= Jagoda Pike =

Canadian journalist and CEO

Jagoda Pike is a Canadian journalist. She is a former publisher of the Toronto Star and former president of the Star Media Group. Effective October 4, 2008, she stepped down as publisher of the Toronto Star and assumed the role of heading Ontario's bid for the 2015 Pan American Games. As of 2016, she is president and CEO of the Homewood Health Inc (2013) in Guelph, Ontario, Canada.

== Early life and education ==
A native of Croatia, Pike's family immigrated to Canada when she was a child. She is an alumna of Trinity College in the University of Toronto and the Osgoode Hall Law School.

== Career ==
Pike joined Torstar Corporation in 1986, where she worked in the corporate legal department. She joined the Toronto Star soon after. Over the next decade, she held roles in industrial relations, human resources and operations. She also worked in the positions of executive director of labour and employee relations and vice-president, operations and human resources. In 1999, Pike was named executive vice-president of the Torstar Daily Newspaper Group. In 2000, she was promoted to the position of general manager of the Toronto Star.

In 2001, Pike was named publisher of The Hamilton Spectator and the senior vice-president of Regional Daily Newspapers for Torstar Media Group. In addition to her role as publisher, she was subsequently appointed president of the newly formed CityMedia Group, which encompassed three daily newspapers – The Hamilton Spectator, The Record of Waterloo Region and The Guelph Mercury – as well as numerous community newspapers published under the Brabant and Fairway mastheads, three magazines, and commercial printing operations.

During her tenure as publisher of The Hamilton Spectator, the paper received the following journalistic honours:

- The Canadian Journalism Foundation's Award of Excellence (2005)
- Three National Newspaper Awards - Investigative Reporting (2004 and 2005), Project of the Year (2003), and Beat Reporting (2005)

Also during her tenure, in 2005, The Spectator was designated a ‘Learning Newsroom’ by the American Society of Newspaper Editors and the American Press Institute – the only Canadian newspaper to receive such a designation.

Pike left CityMedia in February 2006 when she was appointed Executive Vice-president of Newspapers for Torstar, a role that gave her responsibility over all of Torstar's newspapers.

Pike's community and volunteer activity has included:

- Chair of the Canadian Newspaper Association
- Director of Hamilton Health Sciences Corporation
- Trustee of Brock University
- Member of McMaster University's DeGroote School of Business Dean's Advisory Committee
- Chair and President of the Hamilton 2010, 2014, and 2015 Commonwealth Games Bids

In 2004, she was honoured for her volunteer efforts in Hamilton when she received the Safe Communities’ Spirit of the Community Award.

== Personal life ==
Pike has extended family in Croatia, and regularly visits Europe. She has lived for the entirety of her adult life in the Greater Toronto Area (GTA). She is married, and has two children.
