= Tarnowo, Poznań County =

Tarnowo
- Village
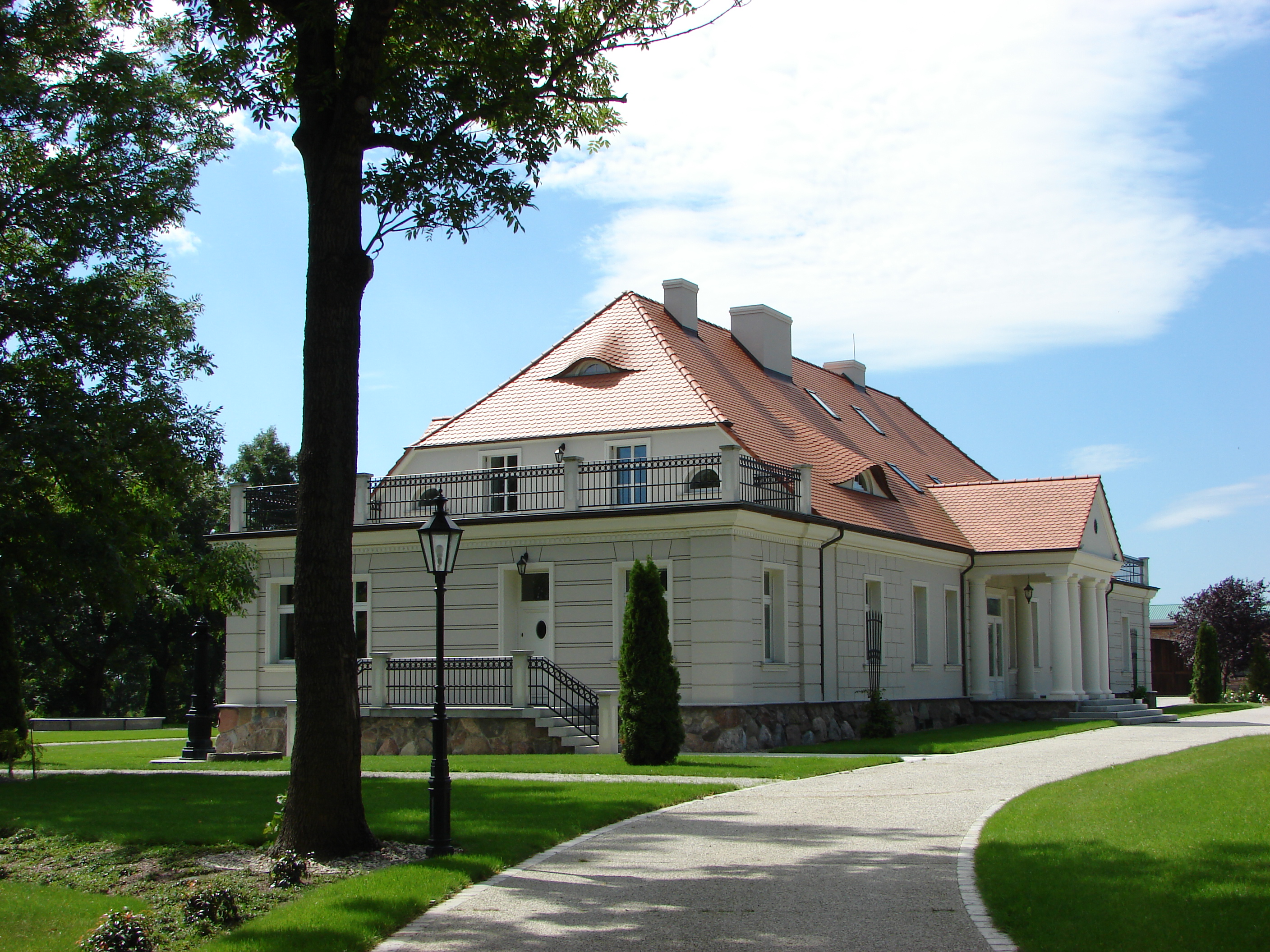
- The manor house. 19th century.

- Location within Poland
- Coordinates: 52°25′N 17°13′E
- Country: Poland
- Voivodeship: Greater Poland
- County: Poznań
- Gmina: Kostrzyn

Tarnowo [tarˈnɔvɔ] is a village in the administrative district of Gmina Kostrzyn, within Poznań County, Greater Poland Voivodeship, in west-central Poland.
