= Glinka Duchowna =

- Village
- Location within Poland
- Coordinates: 52°24′42″N 17°14′20″E
- Country: Poland
- Voivodeship: Greater Poland
- County: Poznań
- Gmina: Kostrzyn

Glinka Duchowna [ˈɡlinka duˈxɔvna] is a village in the administrative district of Gmina Kostrzyn, within Poznań County, Greater Poland Voivodeship, in west-central Poland.
