= Wojciech Jagoda =

Polish footballer

Personal information
- Date of birth: 20 April 1962 (age 64)
- Place of birth: Warsaw, Poland
- Height: 1.80 m (5 ft 11 in)
- Positions: Defender; midfielder

Youth career
- 1974–1981: Legia Warsaw

Senior career*
Years	Team	Apps	(Gls)
1981–1982	Legia Warsaw II		
1982–1986	Hutnik Warsaw	65	(4)
1986–1988	Legia Warsaw	23	(1)
1988–1989	West Adelaide	22	(1)
1989–1990	Adelaide Raiders		
1991	Tiong Bahru Constituency		
1992	PB Melaka		
1992–1993	SV 1922 Emmingen ab Egg		
1993–94	Polonia Warsaw	11	(0)
- * Club domestic league appearances and goals

Wojciech Jagoda (born 20 April 1962) is a Polish football pundit, co-commentator and former player who has worked in Canal+ Sport since 2013.

== Club career ==
Jagoda started his senior career with Legia Warsaw in the Polish Ekstraklasa, where he made thirty-one appearances and scored one goal. After that, he played for Hutnik Warsaw, West Adelaide SC, Adelaide Raiders SC, Tanjong Pagar United, SV 1922 Emmingen ab Egg, and Polonia Warsaw.
