= Tarnov, Bardejov District =

Tarnov
- Municipality
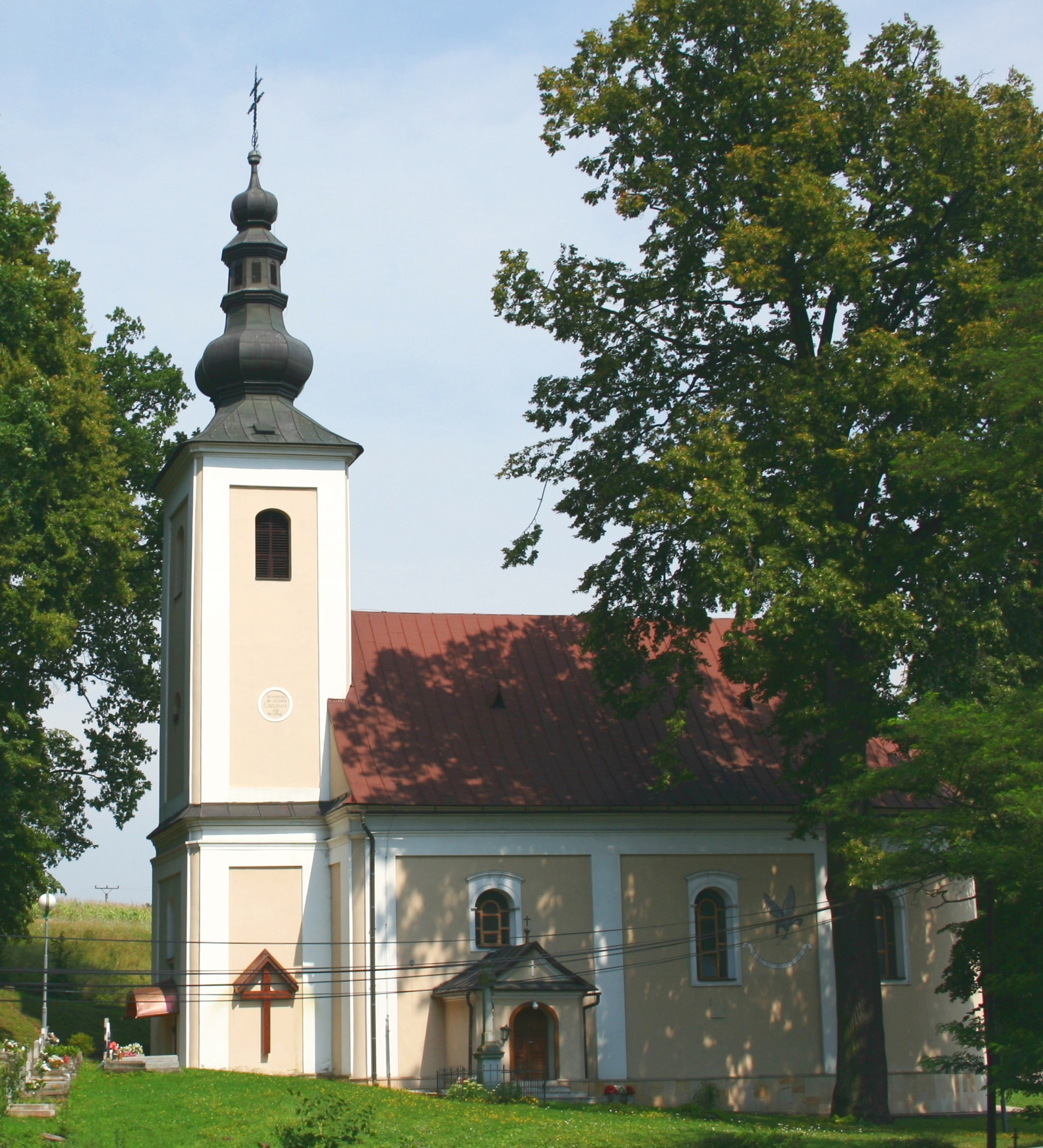

- Flag

- Location of Tarnov in the Prešov Region Location of Tarnov in Slovakia
- Coordinates: 49.32°N 21.17°E
- Country: Slovakia
- Region: Prešov Region
- District: Bardejov District
- First mentioned: 1355

Area
  - Total: 5.84 km^{2} (2.25 sq mi)
- Elevation: 323 m (1,060 ft)

Population (2025)
  - Total: 418
- Time zone: UTC+1 (CET)
  - Summer (DST): UTC+2 (CEST)
- Postal code: 860 1
- Area code: +421 54
- Vehicle registration plate (until 2022): BJ
- Website: obectarnov.sk

Tarnov is a village and municipality in Bardejov District in the Prešov Region of north-east Slovakia.

== History ==
In historical records the village was first mentioned in 1355

== Geography ==
The municipality lies at an altitude of 323 metres (1,060 ft) and covers an area of 5.84 km^{2} (2.25 sq mi) (2025).

== Population ==
Population statistic (10 years)
Year	1995	2005	2015	2025
Count	362	379	381	418
Difference		+4.69%	+0.52%	+9.71%

Population statistic
Year	2024	2025
Count	415	418
Difference		+0.72%

It has a population of 418 people (31 December 2025).

=== Ethnicity ===
Census 2021 (1+ %)
Ethnicity	Number	Fraction
Slovak	388	96.03%
Rusyn	16	3.96%
Not found out	11	2.72%
Total	404	

In year 2021 was 404 people by ethnicity 388 as Slovak, 16 as Rusyn, 11 as Not found out, 2 as Ukrainian, 1 as Russian, 1 as Other and 1 as English.

Note on population: The difference values of population numbers in the table "Population statistic" and in the sections "Ethnicity" & "Religion" is caused by the use of various statistical methods.

=== Religion ===
Census 2021 (1+ %)
Religion	Number	Fraction
Roman Catholic Church	317	78.47%
Greek Catholic Church	40	9.9%
None	21	5.2%
Not found out	9	2.23%
Eastern Orthodox Church	7	1.73%
Evangelical Church	7	1.73%
Total	404	

In year 2021 was 404 people by religion 317 from Roman Catholic Church, 40 from Greek Catholic Church, 21 from None, 9 from Not found out, 7 from Eastern Orthodox Church, 7 from Evangelical Church, 2 from Calvinist Church and 1 from Paganism and natural spirituality.
