= Jahoda =

Jahoda (Czech and Slovak, feminine: Jahodová) or Yahoda (Ukrainian: Ягода) is a surname. It is a cognate of Jagoda and Yagoda. Notable people with the surname include:

- Gloria Jahoda (1926–1980), American author
- Gustav Jahoda (1920–2016), Austrian psychologist
- Libuše Jahodová (born 1992), Czech sport shooter
- Marie Jahoda (1907–2001), Austrian-British psychologist
- Myroslav Yahoda (1957–2018), Ukrainian artist and writer
- Patrik Jahoda (born 1993), Czech para-cyclist
- Roman Jahoda (born 1976), Czech-born Austrian judoka
- Sára Jahodová (born 1984), Czech curler

== See also ==
- Jahoda, a character in 2020 video game Genshin Impact
