= Stefan Jagodziński =

Stefan Jagodziński lived in Stary Korczyn near Kraków during the Nazi German occupation of Poland in World War II. He worked for the Polish underground and was wanted by the Gestapo. Jagodziński was recognized as the Righteous Among the Nations by Yad Vashem in Jerusalem in 1986, for rescuing a Jewish family from the Holocaust.

In late 1942, through his underground contacts Jagodziński came to the aid of Dr. Bronislaw Tenenwurzel's family interned in the Miechów Ghetto near Kraków. Earlier, Tenenwurzels sent their 14-year-old son to a Cistercian monastery in the nearby village of Mogiła. The boy disliked it, and ran away. A Polish friend sent him to stay with Stefan Jagodziński instead, both under assumed names. Together they became active in the Underground. Soon the boy's Jewish identity became publicly known and so, under a new threat they moved to Kraków, from where, thanks to Jagodziński's contacts, Emanuel was smuggled to Hungary. He lived there until liberation in early 1945. Meanwhile, Stefan Jagodziński aided Tenenwurzel's mother and sister with forged "Aryan" papers upon their escape from the Miechów ghetto. Their father was killed in the Kraków-Płaszów concentration camp.

In the following decades Emanuel Tenenwurzel remained in contact with his wartime savior while living in the United States. On July 24, 1986, Yad Vashem recognized Stefan Jagodziński as the Righteous Among the Nations.
