= Przeginia Duchowna =

- Village
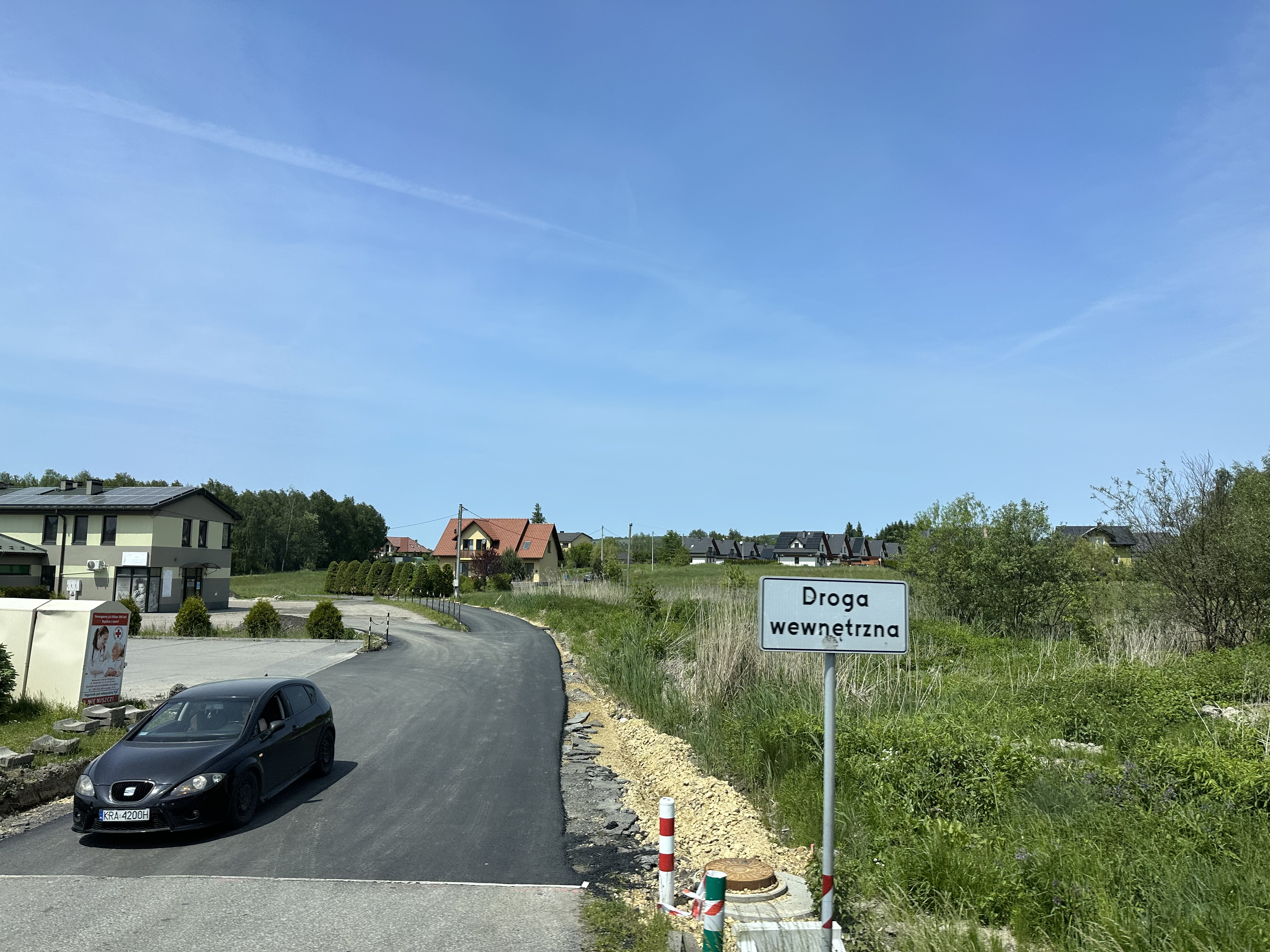

- Location within Poland
- Coordinates: 50°1′N 19°39′E
- Country: Poland
- Voivodeship: Lesser Poland
- County: Kraków
- Gmina: Czernichów

Przeginia Duchowna [pʂɛˈɡiɲa duˈxɔvna] is a village in the administrative district of Gmina Czernichów, within Kraków County, Lesser Poland Voivodeship, in southern Poland.
