= Myroslav Yahoda =

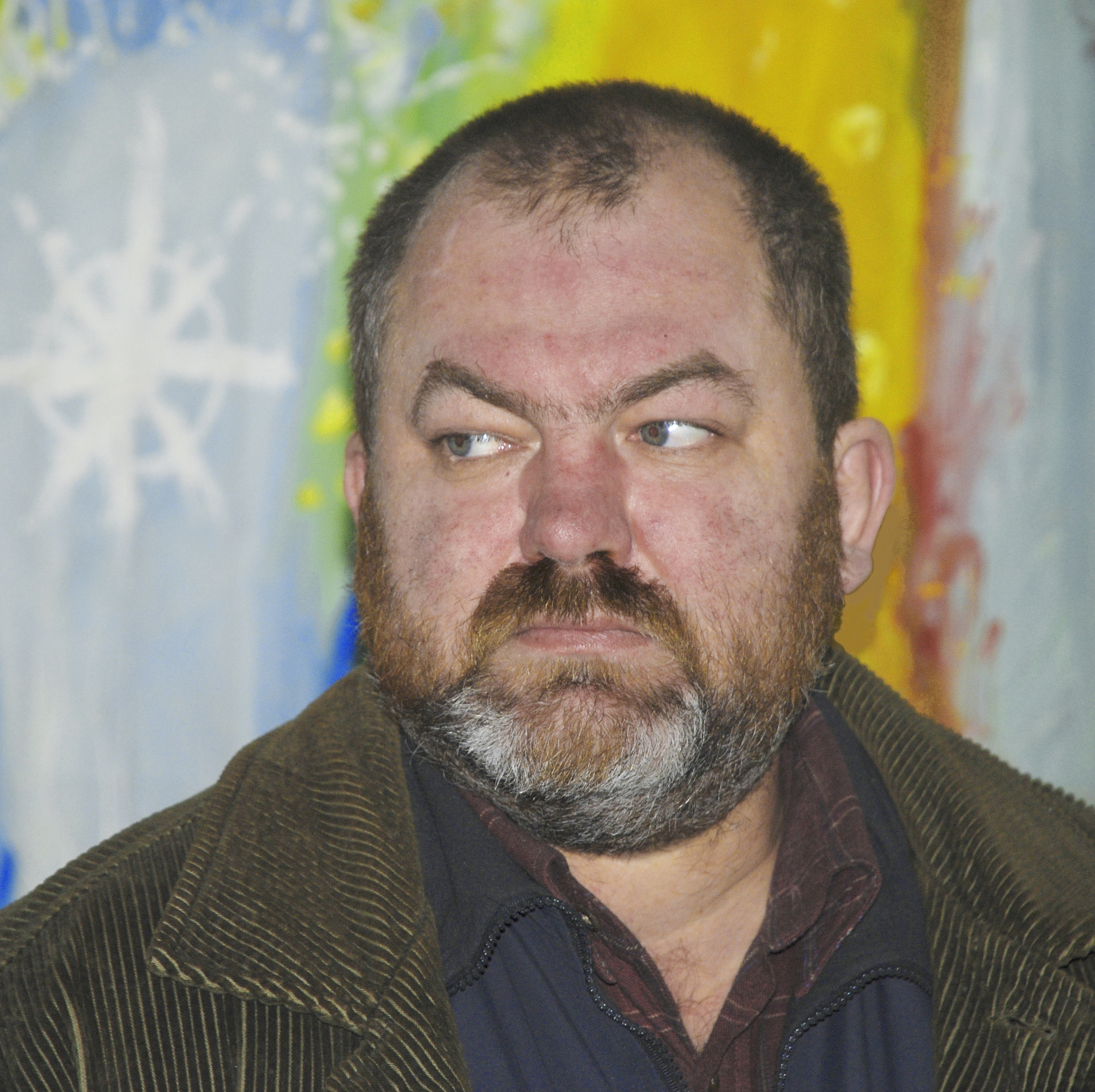
- M. Yahoda. 2006
- Born: Myroslav Yahoda; 23 August 1957; Volsvyn, Lviv Oblast, Soviet Union
- Died: 11 March 2018 (aged 60); Lviv, Ukraine
- Education: Ukrainian Institute of Printing
- Known for: Painting, graphics, poetry, prose, playwright and set design

Myroslav Yahoda, sometimes transliterated as Yagoda (Ukrainian: Мирослав Якович Я́года; 23 August 1957 – 11 March 2018) was a Ukrainian painter, graphic artist, poet, novelist, playwright and set designer. The "Ukrainian Goya" (Note: This is how art critics first dubbed him at his solo exhibition in Austria) – with his diverse art – was a prominent figure in the Ukrainian underground art scene.

== Biography ==
Born to a peasant family, he graduated from school in the village of Girnyk in the Lviv Oblast. After school he studied at the Chervonograd Mining College (even though he never graduated), and in 1975–1977 served in the Soviet army.

In 1980 he came to Lviv, and in 1981–1987 studied in the Ukrainian Institute of Printing (specialization in Graphics Arts), while also painting village churches for a living.

He gradually entered the Lviv art scene, but remained on the sidelines with his rather secluded life. He participated in exhibitions and art events in Lviv, Kyiv, Odesa, Kharkiv, but mostly abroad – in Poland, Austria, Hungary, and Germany. In 2001 he worked in Graz (Austria) as a fellow of the International Cultural City Network program. By the late 1980s, he became a cult figure of the Ukrainian art underground.

He died in his studio in Lviv on 11 March 2018.

== Visual art ==
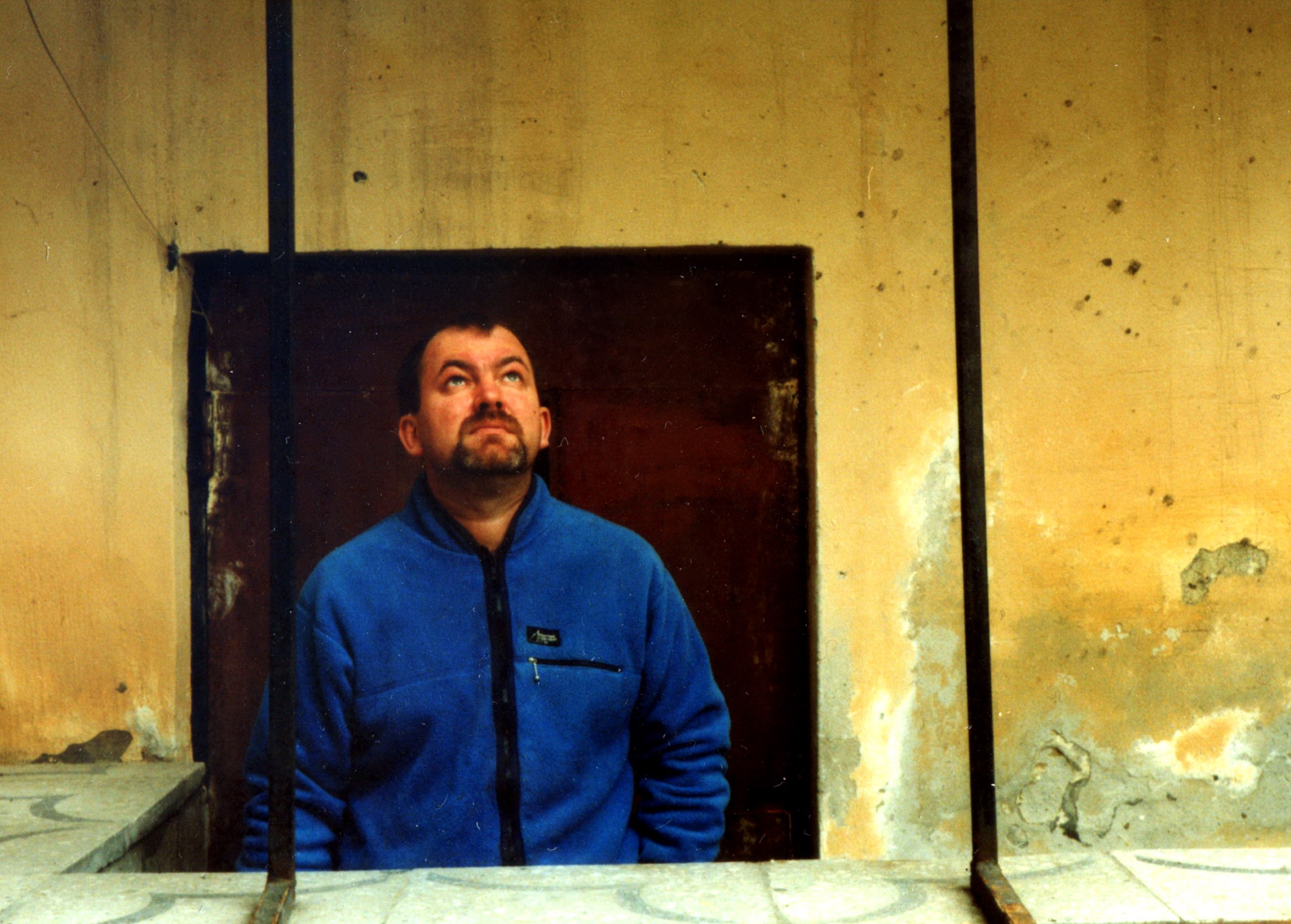
M. Yahoda near his studio. 1999

Drawing has always been an important part of Yahoda's life. (Note: "I have been painting since childhood," noted Myroslav, "and can easily do classical drawings. So, my expression, symbolism, is based on that foundation”.) He proclaimed his artistic credo in his manifesto "The Barbarian Trinity": "... an artist must ask a question to find himself and go to history ... Get out of the picture, beyond that, then make the move to the Universe. Brushes are hidden in the head. The glimmer of the picture is increasingly absorbed out of consciousness, as a nourishment for the subconscious Me. In the painting, its multi-dimensionality is realized through intrinsic actions”.

Yahoda's visual art can be divided into two main periods:

- The early 1990s: mostly introspective (inward-looking) period when the artist delved into his experiences and feelings, when the most important thing was the creative act itself as well as the deep emotions and the mental states associated with them. Therefore, the canvas or graphics that were produced in this creative act were rather secondary and not very well preserved at that. “In order to draw, an experience is badly needed, a terrible experience. I'm not interested in painting as a product". The paintings and graphics of this period are characterized by an expressive composition ("destruction is a paradoxical concept of harmony") and a "psychedelic" mood, mainly "star" compositions dominated by black color. At that time the drawing was also a certain therapy for the artist, to coop with his mental disorder.
- The later 2000s: mostly extrospective (outward-looking) period, when the artist intensified his dialogue with the world, presenting his visions and sharing his experiences. In this "semiotic" period, the artist still did not portray the realities of the world, but invented a specific visual language and shifted to a "more intellectual, and therefore more restrained, almost aphoristic manner". His picturesque style has also changed – "the color becomes extremely bright ... there is a kind of tranquility in the scenes, expressed in static compositions and a quiet smear".
  Just then the framework of purely visual medium became too narrow for the artist: he broadened his poetic perception to also include language (prose and poetry) and theater (plays and set design).

As a whole, all of Yahoda's visual art was creating of a kind of "mental mirrors": "I paint my world so that those who have watched it may find what is inside them". In a broad context, Yahoda's painting continues the European expressionist line of Goya – Munk – Bacon with its tragic worldview, the perception of the world as a territory of horror, the anticipation of catastrophe, the grotesque and the mysticism.

== Literature ==
Complementing his visual art work with prose and poetic creativity, Yahoda was not satisfied with traditional means and "extracted the blood of words" – creating his own aphoristic language with particular sounds and neologisms, stylistic figures, intonation and the author's emphasis on words. This is how he brought the reader into his imaginative worlds, semantic fields and feelings.

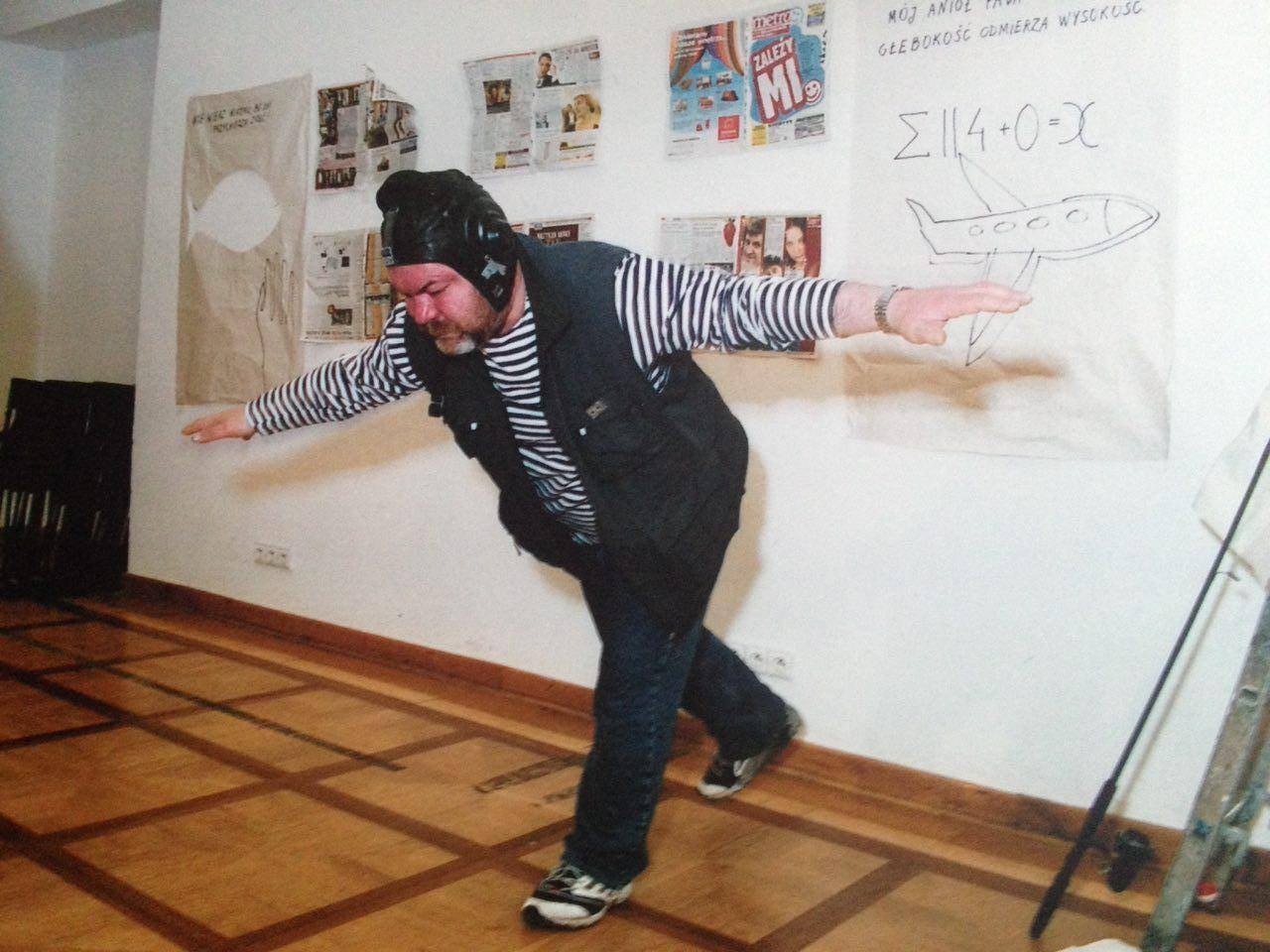
Performance "Fishing — A Mirror Image". Warsaw, 2005

In 1991, for the first time, Yahoda published a selection of his poetry "Madhouse" in the "Avzez" ("Indeed") magazine No.6. In 1992, he published poetry in the "Kremniuk" samizdat magazine.

In 1997 Yahoda published his novel "The War of Small Cruel Numbers" (with the avant-garde "broken" writing technique), as a Ukrainian reminiscence of G. Heine's "Ideas. Le Grand".

In 2005 Yahoda participated in the program of the New Ukrainian Art Festival "24 hours.UA" at the De Novo International Art Symposium at the Centrum Sztuki Współczesnej Zamek Ujazdowski in (Warsaw, Poland). He conducted a poetic reading of "Berries of All Countries, Unite!" and a performance of "Fish — A Mirror Image".

In 2008, Yahoda took part in the project "Ecclesiastes of Another Alphabet" in the "Mezzanine" art studio in Kyiv where he presented his artistic manifesto "The Barbarian Trinity".

== Theatre ==
In 2000, his play "Nothing" was published in the literary almanac "The Royal Forest". In 2002 the director Maria Veres put on the play "Nothing" (with the script and set design by Yahoda) in the "Sky Theater", which took place on the premises of the Maria Zankovetska Theatre.

Yahoda closely collaborated with Atilla Vidnyanszky, then Transcarpathian director. In 2001, they co-created the set design for the play "The Winter Tale" based on the works of William Shakespeare, that was performed in the National Theater in Budapest. In 2003 A.Vidnyanszky put on Yahoda's play "Nothing" (in Hungarian) at the Transcarpathian Regional Hungarian Drama Theater in Berehove. They also worked jointly on two more plays – "Dziady" by Adam Mickiewicz in the Beregovsky Theater (2001), and "Shakespeare's Wreath" at the Gyula Castle Theatre (2005).

Based on Yahoda's poetry, a one-man show "The Road to Light" was staged in Lviv in 2010.

== Exhibitions ==
By the early 2000s, Yahoda's art was more often exhibited abroad than in Lviv. He very selectively participated in group exhibitions – both the artist himself and the curators preferred to present his original art individually.

=== Solo exhibitions ===
- 2020 Exhibition "YA + GOD = A". National Art Museum of Ukraine, Kyiv, Ukraine
- 2019 Retrospective Exhibition «Myroslav Yahoda». Borys Voznytsky Lviv National Art Gallery, Lviv, Ukraine
- 2018 Exhibition of Paintings from Private Collections. Dzyga Gallery, Lviv, Ukraine
- 2016 Exhibition of one painting "The Holodomor". Boim Chapel, Lviv, Ukraine
- 2016 Retrospective Exhibition "Lviv Underground" (as a part of the First International Freierfest Contemporary Art Festival). Museum of Contemporary Art, Odesa, Ukraine
- 2009 "Life". HudGraf Gallery, Kyiv, Ukraine
- 2007 Exhibition of Painting. Warsaw, Poland
- 2006 Exhibition "YA + GOD = A" («Я + GOD = А»). Dzyga Gallery, Lviv, Ukraine
- 2006 Painting Exhibition. Galeria Kolegium, Wrocław, Poland
- 2003 Exhibition «Myroslav Yahoda. Painting, Graphics». Dzyga Gallery, Lviv, Ukraine
- 2001 "Garden of the Lion" ("Garten des Löwen"). Galerie Centrum/Atelier Yin Yang, Graz, Austria
- 1998 Exhibition within the «Cultural City Network» Project. Graz, Austria
- 1997 Painting Exhibition. Poleski Ośrodek Sztuki, Łódź, Poland
- 1997 Exhibition «Myroslav Yahoda. Painting» ("Miroslav Jahoda. Obrazy "). Andy Warhol Museum of Modern Art, Medzilaborce, Slovakia
- 1992 Painting Exhibition. Ósmego Dnia Theater, Poznań, Poland
- 1992 Exhibition "Thence" ("Stamtąd"). Galeria Krytyków «Pokaz», Warsaw (exhibition was also shown in Rzeszów and Wrocław), Poland
- 1991 Painting and Drawing Exhibition, Galeria «N.N.», Lublin, Poland

=== Selected group exhibitions ===
- 2018 "Red Book: The Soviet Art of Lviv in the 80's and 90's". PinchukArtCentre, Kyiv, Ukraine
- 2017 “Lviv: Allies”. National Art Museum of Ukraine. Kyiv, Ukraine
- 2015 Kyiv Biennale 2015. Kyiv, Ukraine
- 2010 "The Ukrainian Slice. Contemporary Art of Ukraine". Warsztaty Kultury, Lublin, Poland
- 1999 "Selected from the Selected". Gerdan Gallery. Lviv, Ukraine
- 1998 "Enough". Dzyga Gallery. Lviv, Ukraine
- 1998 "18 Cities – 18 Artists: (18 Städte – 18 Künstler). Organized by Internationales Haus der Autoren Graz. Austria, Belgium, Slovakia, Croatia, Germany, Poland, Bosnia and Herzegovina, Serbia
- 1996 "Contrasts" (within the framework of the Contrast International Contemporary Music Festival). Gerdan Gallery. Lviv, Ukraine
- 1993 "The Way: From Lviv to Kharkiv". The Ukrainian Seed Gallery, Kharkiv, Ukraine
- 1991 "We Are" ("Jestśmy"). Zachęta Gallery, Warsaw, Poland
- 1991 Sales Exhibition. "Three Dots" Gallery (in the gym of the Lviv Medical Institute during the World Congress of Ukrainian Doctors). Lviv, Ukraine
