= Jagodno, Greater Poland Voivodeship =

Jagodno
- Village
- Location within Poland
- Coordinates: 52°26′N 17°15′E
- Country: Poland
- Voivodeship: Greater Poland
- County: Poznań
- Gmina: Kostrzyn

Jagodno [jaˈɡɔdnɔ] is a village in the administrative district of Gmina Kostrzyn, within Poznań County, Greater Poland Voivodeship, in west-central Poland.
