= Expressway S5 (Poland) =

Road in Poland

Expressway S5
- Droga ekspresowa S5

Route information
- Part of E261
- Length: 353 km (219 mi) 508 km (316 mi) planned

Major junctions
- From: S7 near Ostróda
- A1 near Grudziądz S10 near Bydgoszcz; A2 near Poznań S11 near Poznań
- To: A8 near Wrocław

Location
- Country: Poland
- Major cities: Bydgoszcz, Poznań, Wrocław

Highway system
- National roads in Poland; Voivodeship roads
← S 3	→ S 6

Expressway S5 or express road S5 (Polish: droga ekspresowa S5) is a Polish highway which runs from Grudziądz (connecting to motorway A1 towards Gdańsk) through Poznań (partial concurrency with motorway A2) to Wrocław (connecting to motorway A8).

The expressway was constructed between 2009 and 2022. Its total length is about 353 km (219 mi).

In 2015, it was announced that S5 will be further extended from Grudziądz to Ostróda (connecting to S7). In 2019, an extension from Wrocław to Bolków (connecting to S3 near the border with Czech Republic) was added to the plans. Both extensions are intended to be completed as part of the road construction plan until 2033, which will increase the total length of the expressway to about 508 km (316 mi).

== Route ==
Section	Opening dates	Notes
Ostróda (S7) – Grudziądz (A1)	planned 2033	The bypass of Ostróda was completed in 2022
Grudziądz (A1) – Bydgoszcz (S10)	2020 – 2022	
Bydgoszcz (S10) – Poznań (A2)	2012 – 2021	
Poznań (A2) – Wrocław (A8)	2014 – 2019	
Wrocław (S8) – Bolków (S3)	planned 2032	

== History ==
The construction of the road received higher priority after Poland was selected as one of the hosts of the UEFA Euro 2012 championship, since it would have provided a direct connection between three of the four Polish cities hosting matches: Poznań, Wrocław and Gdańsk. However, plans to finish the road before the championship were proven too optimistic and only a section between the A2 motorway and Gniezno (35 km), opened on 4 June 2012, was completed by that time. This fragment of S5 serves as the eastern bypass of Poznań.

In October 2015, the planned future route of the expressway has been extended from the Nowe Marzy junction (near Grudziądz) to Ostróda. In November 2015, contracts were signed for the Gniezno-Grudziądz section, a total of about 150 km. In May 2017, the continuation of the S5 from the end of the eastern bypass of Poznań to just north of Gniezno opened to traffic, thus diverting most transit traffic away from Gniezno itself. In 2019, the planned route was extended from Wrocław to Bolków. In 2022, the last section of the original route was completed.

== Exit List ==
Country	Voivodeship	Location	km	mi	Exit	Name	Destinations	Notes
Poland	Warmian-Masurian Voivodeship	Gmina Ostróda			—	transition from national road	DK 16	Eastern endpoint of expressway
Poland	Warmian-Masurian Voivodeship	Gmina Ostróda			—	Ostróda Południe	S 7 / E77 — Gdańsk/Warsaw; Ostróda	cloverleaf interchange Południe means south currently signed as DK 16
Poland	Warmian-Masurian Voivodeship	Gmina Ostróda			—	transition to national road	DK 16	Western endpoint of expressway section
Poland	Warmian-Masurian Voivodeship	Gmina Ostróda			—	Ostróda Zachód	DK 15 — Ostróda/Toruń	Exit under construction as part of Ornowo — Wirwajdy section
Poland	Warmian-Masurian Voivodeship	Gmina Ostróda			—	Roundabout near Wirwajdy	DK 16 — Grudziądz	Roundabout under construction as part of Ornowo — Wirwajdy section
Poland	Warmian-Masurian Voivodeship	—			—	Wirwajdy — Border with Kuyavian-Pomeranian Voivodeship section	Iława	section in early planning stage
Poland	Kuyavian-Pomeranian Voivodeship	—			—	Border with Warmian-Masurian Voivodeship — Nowe Marzy section	Grudziądz	section in early planning stage section will include a concurrency with existing A 1 / E75
Poland	Kuyavian-Pomeranian Voivodeship	Gmina Dragacz			—	transition from national road	DK 91	Northern endpoint of expressway section Northern endpoint of concurrency with national road 91
Poland	Kuyavian-Pomeranian Voivodeship	Gmina Dragacz			1	Nowe Marzy interchange	A 1 / E75 — Gdańsk/Toruń/Łódź	double trumpet interchange interchange equipped with toll station
Poland	Kuyavian-Pomeranian Voivodeship	Gmina Świecie			2	Sartowice	Sartowice	
Poland	Kuyavian-Pomeranian Voivodeship	Gmina Świecie			3	Świecie Północ	DW 272 — Świecie/Dolna Grupa	Północ means north
Poland	Kuyavian-Pomeranian Voivodeship	Gmina Świecie			4	Świecie Zachód	DK 91 — Świecie/Toruń DW 240 — Tuchola/Chojnice	Southern endpoint of concurrency with national road 91 Zachód means west
Poland	Kuyavian-Pomeranian Voivodeship	Gmina Świecie			5	Świecie Południe	Świecie	no exit ramp Gdańsk → Świecie Południe means south
Poland	Kuyavian-Pomeranian Voivodeship	Gmina Świecie			6	Gruczno	DW 245 — Gruczno	
Poland	Kuyavian-Pomeranian Voivodeship	Gmina Pruszcz			7	Pruszcz	DW 248 — Pruszcz	
Poland	Kuyavian-Pomeranian Voivodeship	Gmina Dobrcz			8	Trzeciewiec	DK 56 — Koronowo DW 256 — Włóki	
Poland	Kuyavian-Pomeranian Voivodeship	Gmina Osielsko			9	Bydgoszcz Północ	DW 244 — Strzelce Dolne DW 239 — Bydgoszcz-Centrum	Północ means north Centrum means center
Poland	Kuyavian-Pomeranian Voivodeship	Gmina Osielsko			10	Maksymilianowo	DW 244 — Maksymilianowo	
Poland	Kuyavian-Pomeranian Voivodeship	Gmina Sicienko			11	Bydgoszcz Opławiec	DK 25 — Koszalin DW 238 — Bydgoszcz-Centrum DW 244 — Tryszczyn	Northern endpoint of concurrency with national road 25 Centrum means center
Poland	Kuyavian-Pomeranian Voivodeship	Gmina Sicienko			12	Bydgoszcz Zachód interchange	DK 10 — Szczecin; DK 80 — Bydgoszcz-Centrum	Northern endpoint of concurrency with Expressway S10 modified cloverleaf interchange Centrum means center
Poland	Kuyavian-Pomeranian Voivodeship	Gmina Białe Błota			13	Bydgoszcz Miedzyń	Lisi-Ogon/Bydgoszcz-Centrum	Centrum means center
Poland	Kuyavian-Pomeranian Voivodeship	Gmina Białe Błota			14	Bydgoszcz Błonie interchange	S 10 — Toruń/Warsaw; DK 25 — Konin DW 223 — Bydgoszcz-Centrum	Southern endpoint of concurrency with Expressway S10 and national road 25 main carriageway continues towards Toruń cloverleaf interchange Centrum means center
Poland	Kuyavian-Pomeranian Voivodeship	Gmina Szubin			15	Rynarzewo	Rynarzewo	
Poland	Kuyavian-Pomeranian Voivodeship	Gmina Szubin			16	Szubin Północ	Szubin	Północ means north
Poland	Kuyavian-Pomeranian Voivodeship	Gmina Szubin			17	Szubin Południe	DW 247 — Szubin/Kcynia	Południe means south
Poland	Kuyavian-Pomeranian Voivodeship	Gmina Szubin			18	Pałuki	Wąsosz	
Poland	Kuyavian-Pomeranian Voivodeship	Gmina Żnin			19	Żnin Północ	DW 251 — Żnin	Northern endpoint of concurrency with Voivodeship road 251 Północ means north
Poland	Kuyavian-Pomeranian Voivodeship	Gmina Żnin			20	Żnin Zachód	DW 251 — Żnin/Rogoźno	Southern endpoint of concurrency with Voivodeship road 251 Zachód means west
Poland	Kuyavian-Pomeranian Voivodeship	Gmina Żnin			21	Biskupin	Biskupin	
Poland	Kuyavian-Pomeranian Voivodeship	Gmina Rogowo			22	Rogowo	Rogowo	
Poland	Kuyavian-Pomeranian Voivodeship	Gmina Rogowo			23	Lubcz	Lubcz	
Poland	Greater Poland Voivodeship	Gmina Mieleszyn			24	Mieleszyn	DW 194 — Gniezno	
Poland	Greater Poland Voivodeship	Gmina Gniezno			25	Gniezno Północ	DW 194 — Gniezno	Północ means north
Poland	Greater Poland Voivodeship	Gmina Gniezno			26	Kłecko	DW 190 — Gniezno/Kłecko	
Poland	Greater Poland Voivodeship	Gmina Łubowo			27	Gniezno Południe	DW 194 — Gniezno/Poznań	Południe means south
Poland	Greater Poland Voivodeship	Gmina Łubowo			28	Łubowo	Łubowo	
Poland	Greater Poland Voivodeship	Gmina Łubowo			29	Czerniejewo	Czerniejewo/Pobiedziska	
Poland	Greater Poland Voivodeship	Gmina Kostrzyn			30	Iwno	Iwno	
Poland	Greater Poland Voivodeship	Gmina Kostrzyn			31	Kostrzyn	DK 92 — Kostrzyn/Poznań/Wrześnica	
Poland	Greater Poland Voivodeship	Gmina Kostrzyn			32	Strumiany	Kostrzyn/Strumiany	
Poland	Greater Poland Voivodeship	Gmina Kostrzyn			33	Kleszczewo	DW 434 — Kleszczewo/Kórnik	
Poland	Greater Poland Voivodeship	Gmina Kleszczewo			34	Poznań Wschód interchange	A 2 / E30 — Łódź/Warsaw	Eastern endpoint of concurrency with A2 autostrada trumpet interchange Wschód means east
Poland	Greater Poland Voivodeship	Poznań			13	Poznań Krzesiny interchange	S 11 — Katowice	Eastern endpoint of concurrency with Expressway S11 Exit number part of A2 autostrada cloverleaf interchange
Poland	Greater Poland Voivodeship	Poznań			12	Poznań Luboń	DW 430 — Poznań-Centrum/Mosina	Exit number part of A2 autostrada Centrum means center
Poland	Greater Poland Voivodeship	Poznań			11	Poznań Komorniki	DW 196 — Poznań-Centrum; DW 311 — Stęszew	Exit number part of A2 autostrada Centrum means center
Poland	Greater Poland Voivodeship	Gmina Komorniki			35	Poznań Zachód interchange	A 2 / E30 — Świecko/Berlin S 11 — Piła	Western endpoint of concurrency with A2 autostrada Western endpoint of concurrency with Expressway S11 double trumpet interchange Zachód means west
Poland	Greater Poland Voivodeship	Gmina Komorniki			36	Konarzewo	Konarzewo	
Poland	Greater Poland Voivodeship	Gmina Stęszew			37	Stęszew	DK 32 — Zielona Góra; Stęszew	
Poland	Greater Poland Voivodeship	Gmina Stęszew			38	Mosina	DW 311 — Stęszew	
Poland	Greater Poland Voivodeship	Gmina Czempiń			39	Czempiń	DW 310 — Czempiń; DW 311 — Stęszew	
Poland	Greater Poland Voivodeship	Gmina Kościan			40	Kościan Północ	DW 308 — Kościan/Grodzisk Wielkopolski	Północ means north
Poland	Greater Poland Voivodeship	Gmina Kościan			41	Kościan Południe	Kościan	Południe means south
Poland	Greater Poland Voivodeship	Gmina Śmigiel			42	Śmigiel Północ	DW 312 — Śmigiel/Rakoniewice	Północ means north
Poland	Greater Poland Voivodeship	Gmina Śmigiel			43	Śmigiel Południe	DW 309 — Leszno; Śmigiel	Południe means south
Poland	Greater Poland Voivodeship	Gmina Lipno			44	Lipno	DW 309 — Leszno	
Poland	Greater Poland Voivodeship	Gmina Święciechowa			45	Święciechowa	Leszno/Święciechowa	
Poland	Greater Poland Voivodeship	Gmina Święciechowa			46	Leszno Zachód	DK 12 — Żary/Leszno	Zachód means west
Poland	Greater Poland Voivodeship	Gmina Święciechowa			47	Leszno Południe	DW 323 — Leszno/Lubin	Południe means south
Poland	Greater Poland Voivodeship	Gmina Rydzyna			48	Rydzyna	DW 309 — Rydzyna	
Poland	Greater Poland Voivodeship	Gmina Bojanowo			49	Bojanowo	DW 309 — Bojanowo	
Poland	Greater Poland Voivodeship	Gmina Rawicz			50	Rawicz	DK 36 — Rawicz/Ostrów Wielkopolski/Lubin	
Poland	Lower Silesian Voivodeship	Gmina Żmigród			51	Korzeńsko	Korzeńsko	
Poland	Lower Silesian Voivodeship	Gmina Żmigród			52	Żmigródek	DW 439 — Żmigródek/Milicz DW 359 — Żmigród	
Poland	Lower Silesian Voivodeship	Gmina Żmigród			53	Żmigród	DW 339 — Żmigród/Wołów	
Poland	Lower Silesian Voivodeship	Gmina Prusice			54	Krościna	DW 359 — Prusice	
Poland	Lower Silesian Voivodeship	Gmina Prusice			55	Prusice	Prusice	
Poland	Lower Silesian Voivodeship	Gmina Trzebnica			56	Trzebnica	DK 15 — Krotoszyn DW 340 — Ścinawa; Trzebnica	
Poland	Lower Silesian Voivodeship	Gmina Wisznia Mała			57	Kryniczno	DW 359 — Kryniczno	
Poland	Lower Silesian Voivodeship	Wrocław			58	Wrocław Północ interchange	A 8 / E67 — Łódź/Kłodzko; DK 5 — Wrocław-Centrum/Lubawka	combination interchange Expressway currently ends here Centrum means center
Poland	Lower Silesian Voivodeship	—			—	Sobótka — Bolków section	S 8 / E67/Sobótka/Wałbrzych/Bolków/ S 3 / E65	section in early planning stage
1.000 mi = 1.609 km; 1.000 km = 0.621 mi: Concurrency terminus; Incomplete access; Proposed; Tolled; Route transition

== See also ==
- Highways in Poland
