= Zimin =

Zimin may refer to

- Zimin (surname)
- Zimin, Poland – a village
- Zimin volcano – a Kamchtka volcano
- Zimin Opera in Moscow, Russia
