= Markowice =

Markowice may refer to:

- Markowice, Greater Poland Voivodeship (west-central Poland)
- Markowice, Kuyavian-Pomeranian Voivodeship (north-central Poland)
- Markowice, Silesian Voivodeship (south Poland)
- Markowice, Opole Voivodeship (south-west Poland)

== See also ==
- Marko (disambiguation)
