= Psary, Trzebnica County =

Psary
- Village
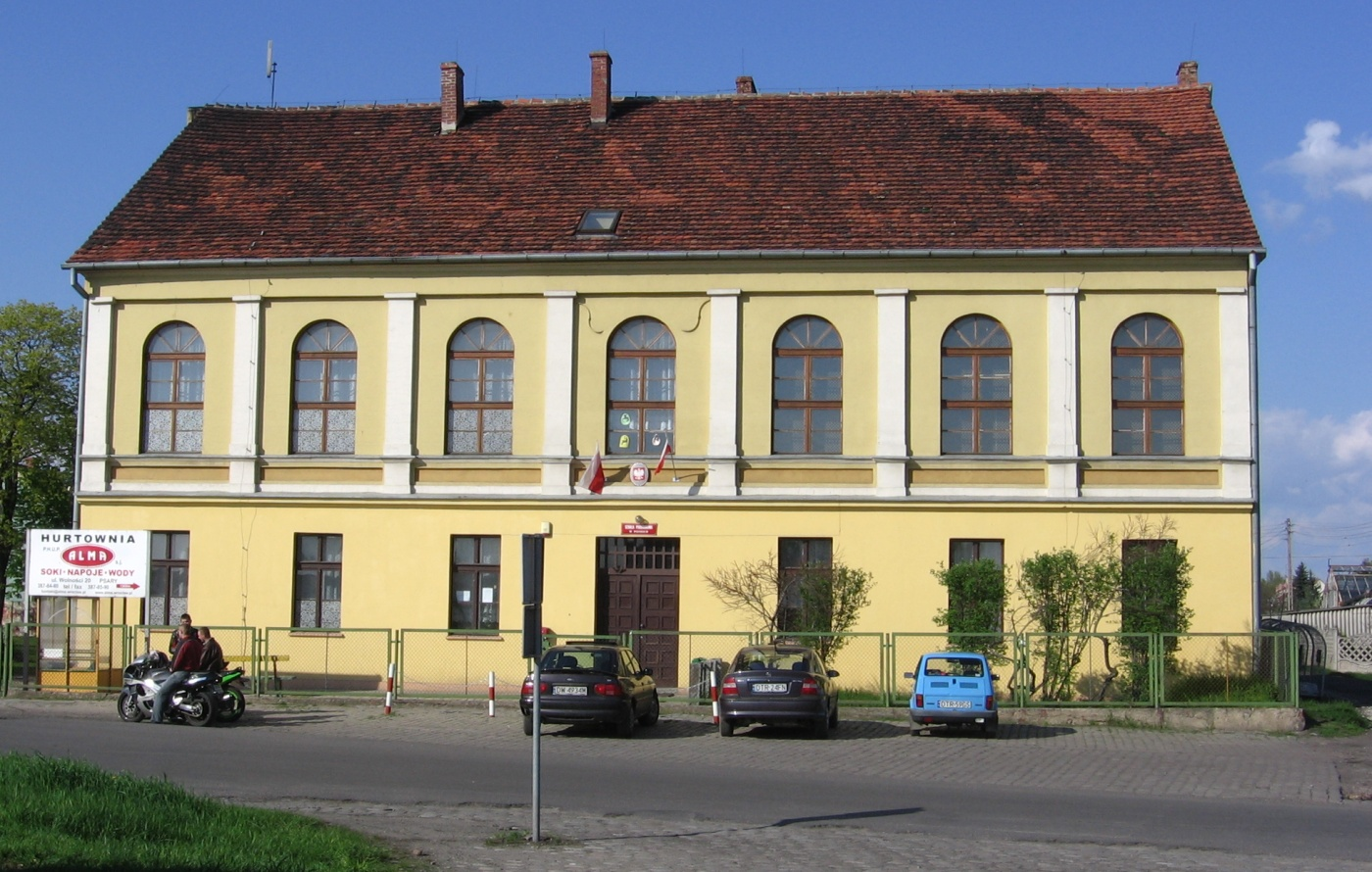

- Location within Poland
- Coordinates: 51°11′5″N 17°1′53″E
- Country: Poland
- Voivodeship: Lower Silesian
- County: Trzebnica
- Gmina: Wisznia Mała
- Population: 850

Psary [ˈpsarɨ] is a village in the administrative district of Gmina Wisznia Mała, within Trzebnica County, Lower Silesian Voivodeship, in south-western Poland.
