= Strzeszów, Lower Silesian Voivodeship =

Strzeszów
- Village
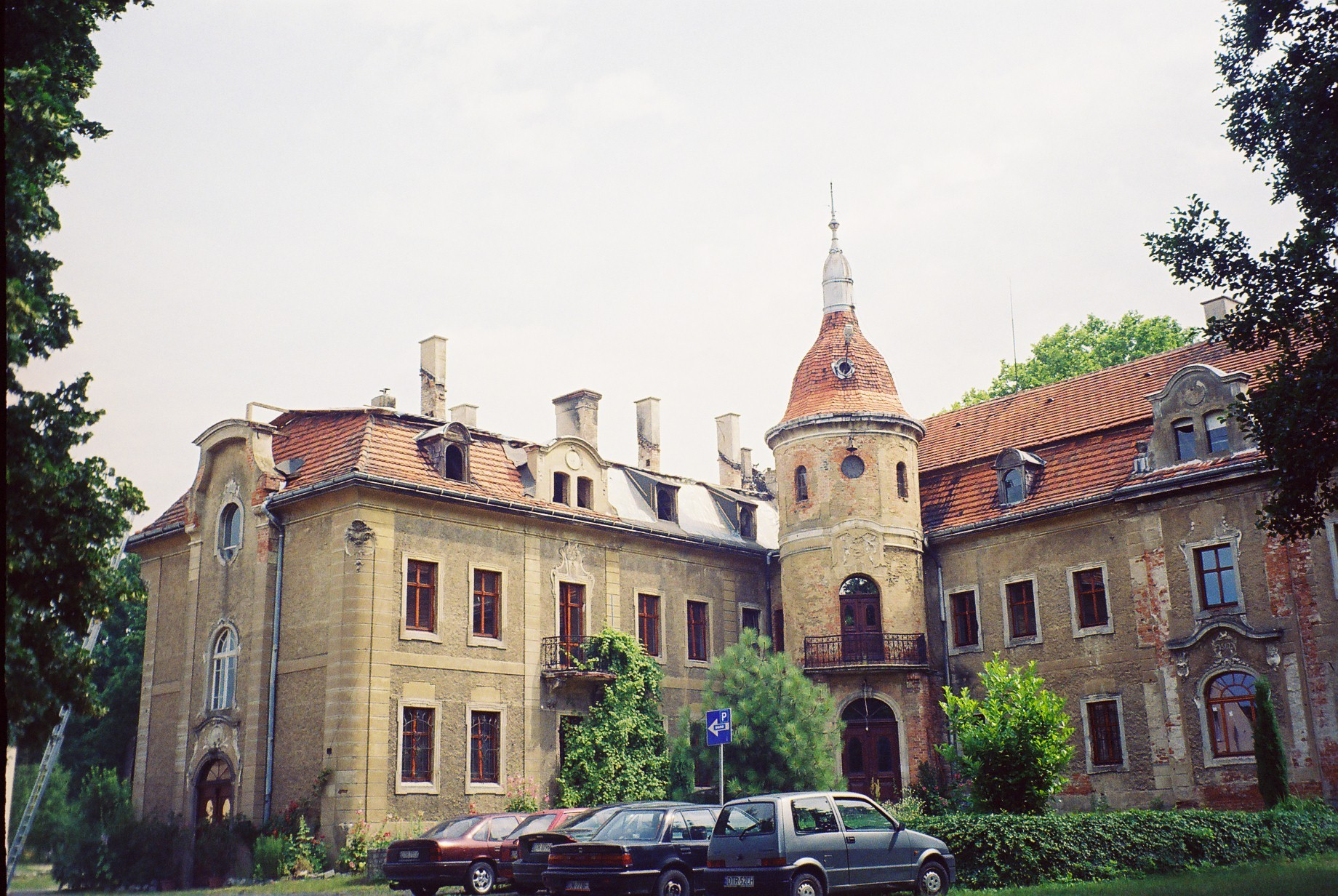
- Palace

- Location within Poland
- Coordinates: 51°15′N 17°0′E
- Country: Poland
- Voivodeship: Lower Silesian
- County: Trzebnica
- Gmina: Wisznia Mała

Strzeszów [ˈstʂɛʂuf] is a village in the administrative district of Gmina Wisznia Mała, within Trzebnica County, Lower Silesian Voivodeship, in south-western Poland.
