= Szewce, Lower Silesian Voivodeship =

Szewce
- Village
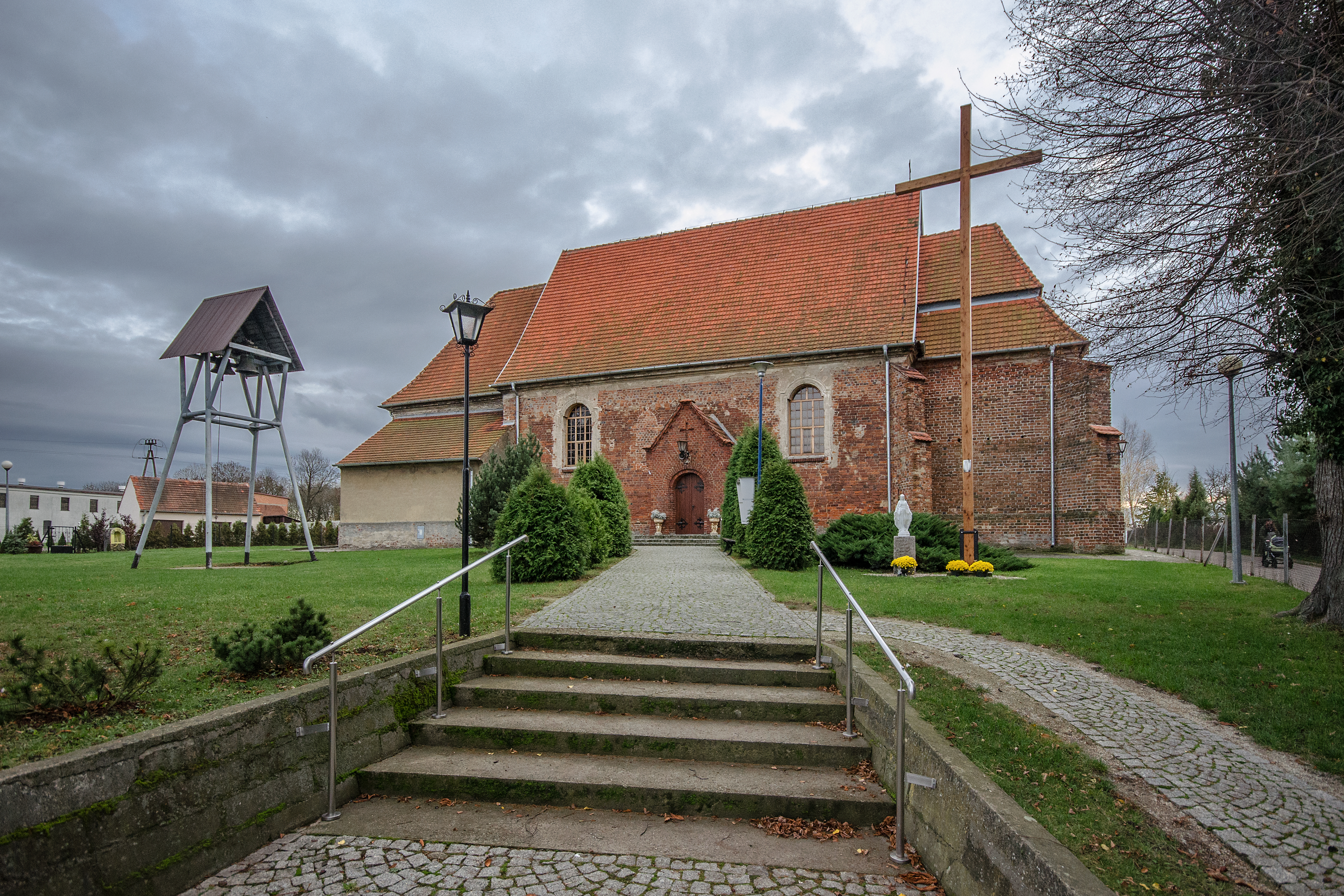

- Location within Poland
- Coordinates: 51°13′21″N 16°58′38″E
- Country: Poland
- Voivodeship: Lower Silesian
- County: Trzebnica
- Gmina: Wisznia Mała
- Population (approx.): 900

Szewce [ˈʂɛft͡sɛ] is a village in the administrative district of Gmina Wisznia Mała, within Trzebnica County, Lower Silesian Voivodeship, in south-western Poland.
