= Rogoż =

- Village
- Location within Poland
- Coordinates: 51°12′58″N 17°01′27″E
- Country: Poland
- Voivodeship: Lower Silesian
- County: Trzebnica
- Gmina: Wisznia Mała

Rogoż [ˈrɔɡɔʂ] is a village in the administrative district of Gmina Wisznia Mała, within Trzebnica County, Lower Silesian Voivodeship, in south-western Poland.
