= Krzyżanowice, Lower Silesian Voivodeship =

Krzyżanowice
- Village
- Location within Poland
- Coordinates: 51°10′24″N 17°03′03″E
- Country: Poland
- Voivodeship: Lower Silesian
- County: Trzebnica
- Gmina: Wisznia Mała

Krzyżanowice [kʂɨʐanɔˈvit͡sɛ] is a village in the administrative district of Gmina Wisznia Mała, within Trzebnica County, Lower Silesian Voivodeship, in south-western Poland.
