= Mienice =

- Village
- Location within Poland
- Coordinates: 51°16′35″N 17°00′06″E
- Country: Poland
- Voivodeship: Lower Silesian
- County: Trzebnica
- Gmina: Wisznia Mała

Mienice [mjɛˈnit͡sɛ] is a village in the administrative district of Gmina Wisznia Mała, within Trzebnica County, Lower Silesian Voivodeship, in south-western Poland.
