= Piotrkowiczki =

- Village
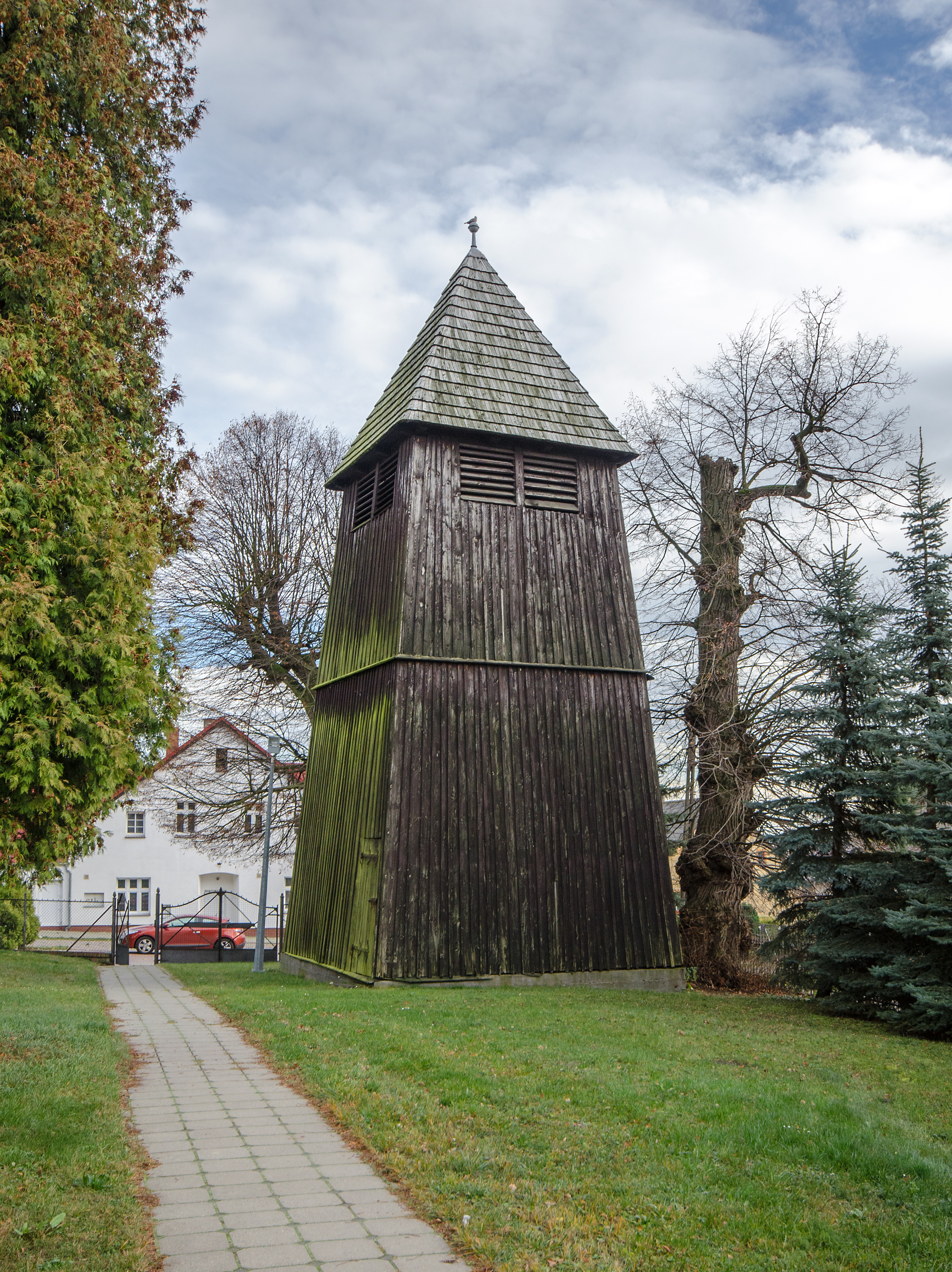

- Location within Poland
- Coordinates: 51°16′N 17°2′E
- Country: Poland
- Voivodeship: Lower Silesian
- County: Trzebnica
- Gmina: Wisznia Mała

Piotrkowiczki [pjɔtrkɔˈvit͡ʂki] is a village in the administrative district of Gmina Wisznia Mała, within Trzebnica County, Lower Silesian Voivodeship, in south-western Poland.
