= Ligota Piękna =

- Village
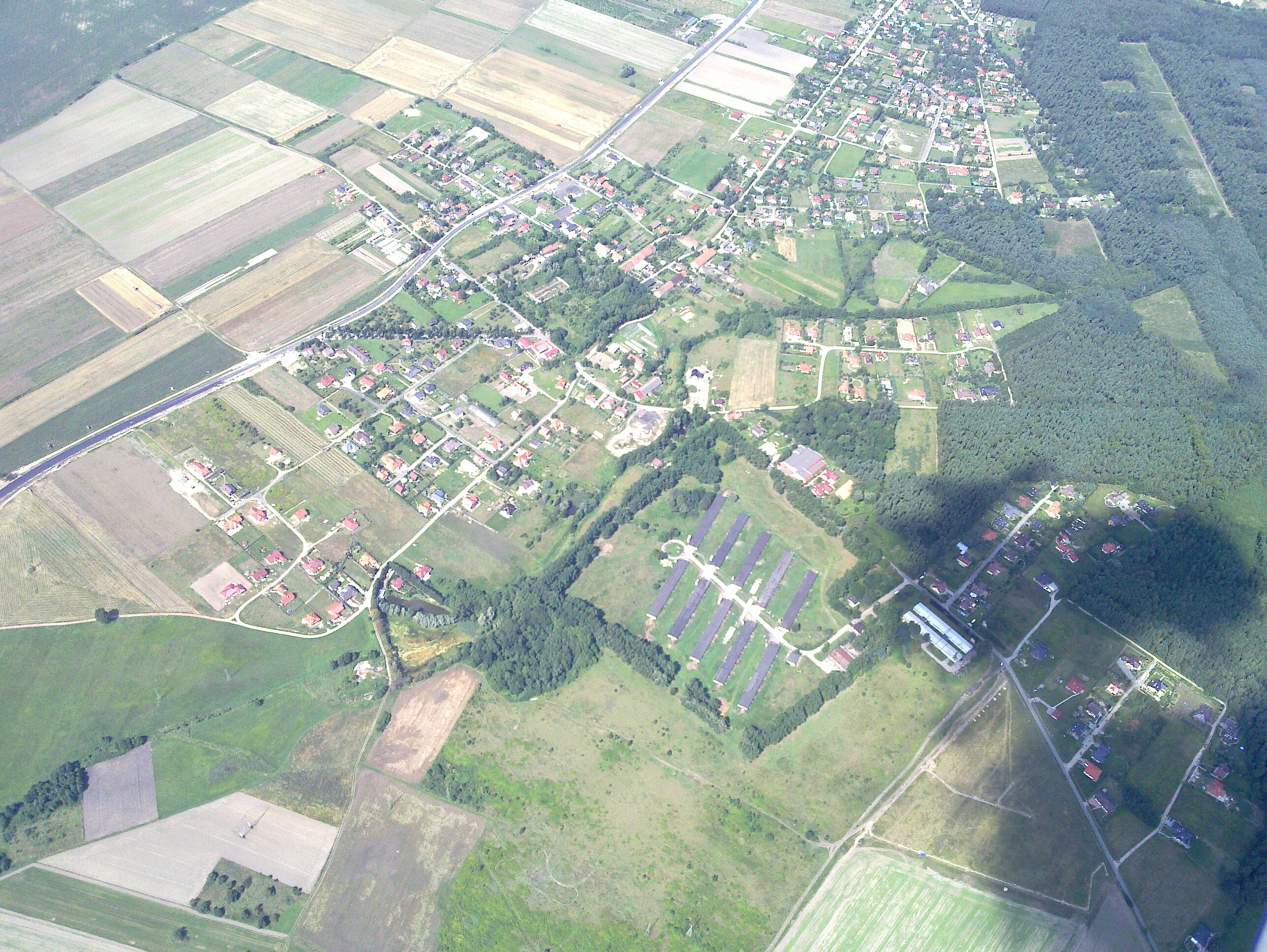

- Location within Poland
- Coordinates: 51°13′54″N 17°02′47″E
- Country: Poland
- Voivodeship: Lower Silesian
- County: Trzebnica
- Gmina: Wisznia Mała

Ligota Piękna (Polish pronunciation: [liˈɡɔta ˈpjɛŋkna]) is a village in the administrative district of Gmina Wisznia Mała, within Trzebnica County, Lower Silesian Voivodeship, in south-western Poland.
