= Pierwoszów =

- Village
- Location within Poland
- Coordinates: 51°14′57″N 17°04′40″E
- Country: Poland
- Voivodeship: Lower Silesian
- County: Trzebnica
- Gmina: Wisznia Mała
- Population: 180

Pierwoszów [pjɛrˈvɔʂuf] is a village in the administrative district of Gmina Wisznia Mała, within Trzebnica County, Lower Silesian Voivodeship, in Southwestern Poland.
