= Gowarzewo =

- Village
- Location within Poland
- Coordinates: 52°21′N 17°7′E
- Country: Poland
- Voivodeship: Greater Poland
- County: Poznań
- Gmina: Kleszczewo

Gowarzewo [ɡɔvaˈʐɛvɔ] is a village in the administrative district of Gmina Kleszczewo, within Poznań County, Greater Poland Voivodeship, in west-central Poland.
