= Wisznia Mała =

- Village
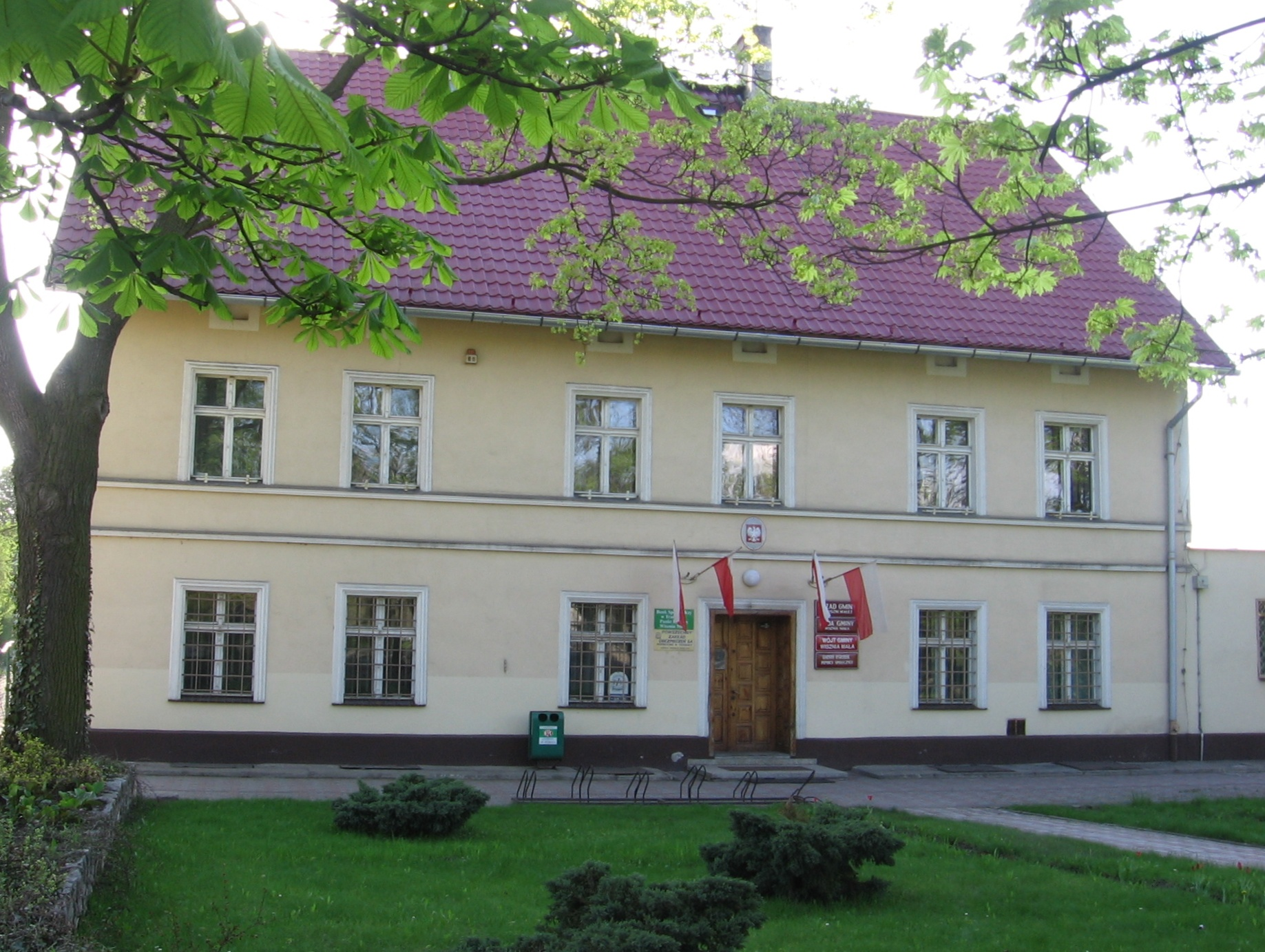
- Local council

- Location within Poland
- Coordinates: 51°15′N 17°2′E
- Country: Poland
- Voivodeship: Lower Silesian
- County: Trzebnica
- Gmina: Wisznia Mała

Wisznia Mała ([ˈviʂɲa ˈmawa]) (German: Wiese) is a village in Trzebnica County, Lower Silesian Voivodeship, in south-western Poland. It is the seat of the administrative district (gmina) called Gmina Wisznia Mała.

The village belonged to the Wroclaw Voivodeship.
