= Szewce, Gmina Kleszczewo =

Szewce
- Village
- Location within Poland
- Coordinates: 52°20′53″N 17°7′57″E
- Country: Poland
- Voivodeship: Greater Poland
- County: Poznań
- Gmina: Kleszczewo
- Population: 80

Szewce [ˈʂɛft͡sɛ] is a village in the administrative district of Gmina Kleszczewo, within Poznań County, Greater Poland Voivodeship, in west-central Poland.
