= Lipowice =

- Village
- Location within Poland
- Coordinates: 52°18′36″N 17°10′51″E
- Country: Poland
- Voivodeship: Greater Poland
- County: Poznań
- Gmina: Kleszczewo

Lipowice [lipɔˈvit͡sɛ] is a village in the administrative district of Gmina Kleszczewo, within Poznań County, Greater Poland Voivodeship, in west-central Poland.
