= Śródka, Poznań County =

Śródka
- Village
- Location within Poland
- Coordinates: 52°18′N 17°7′E
- Country: Poland
- Voivodeship: Greater Poland
- County: Poznań
- Gmina: Kleszczewo
- Population: 267
- Time zone: UTC+1 (CET)
  - Summer (DST): UTC+2 (CEST)
- Vehicle registration: PZ

Śródka [ˈɕrutka] is a village in the administrative district of Gmina Kleszczewo, within Poznań County, Greater Poland Voivodeship, in west-central Poland.

== History ==
Śródka was a private church village of the Poznań Cathedral Chapter, administratively located in the Poznań County in the Poznań Voivodeship in the Greater Poland Province.

During the German occupation of Poland (World War II), in 1941, the occupiers carried out expulsions of Poles, whose houses and farms were then handed over to German colonists as part of the Lebensraum policy. Expelled Poles were enslaved as forced labour and sent either to Germany or to new German colonists in the county.
