= Machnice =

- Village
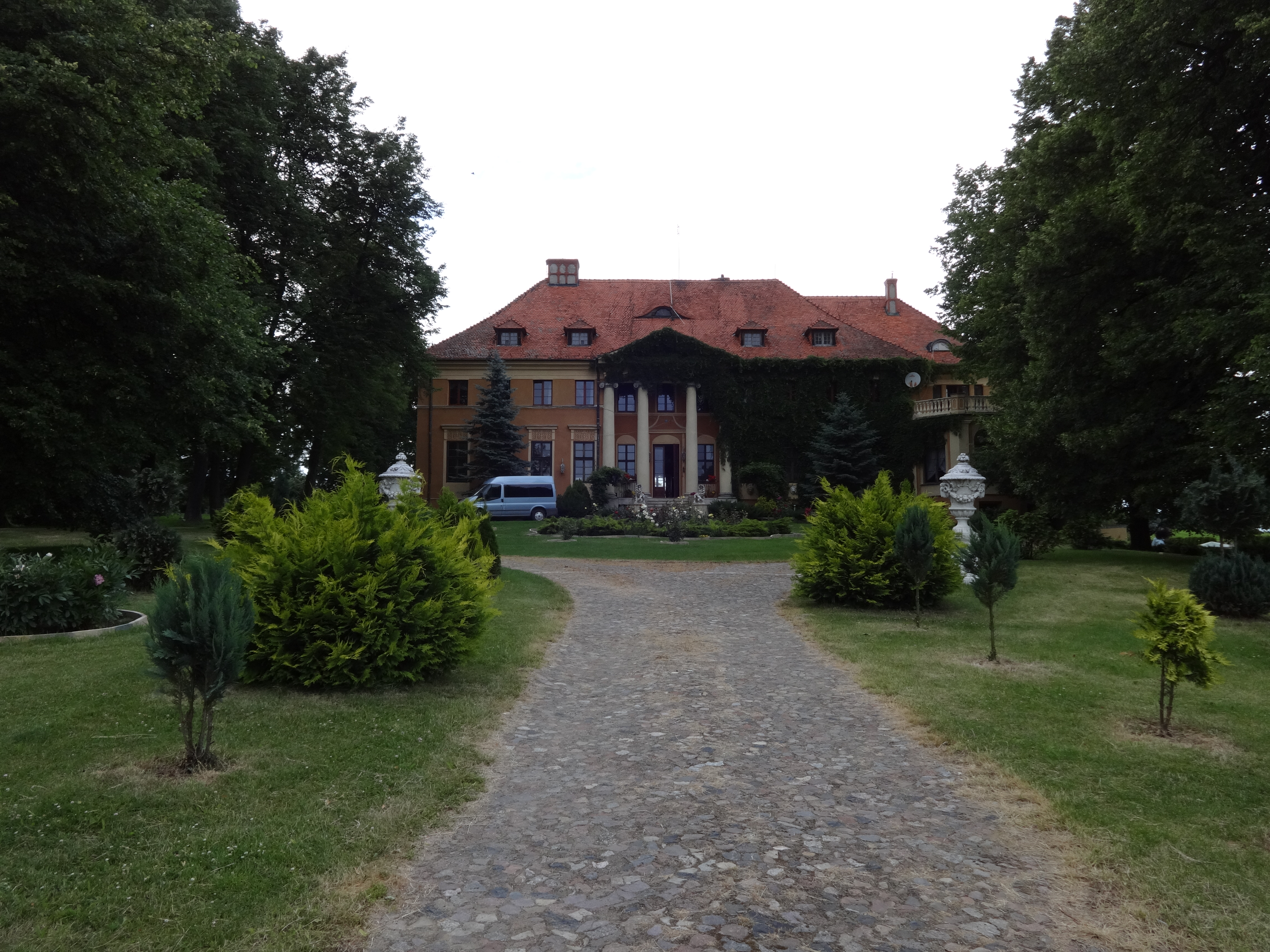
- Palace

- Location within Poland
- Coordinates: 51°16′22″N 17°3′33″E
- Country: Poland
- Voivodeship: Lower Silesian
- County: Trzebnica
- Gmina: Wisznia Mała
- Population: 320

Machnice [maxˈnit͡sɛ] is a village in the administrative district of Gmina Wisznia Mała, within Trzebnica County, Lower Silesian Voivodeship, in south-western Poland.
