= Krerowo =

- Village
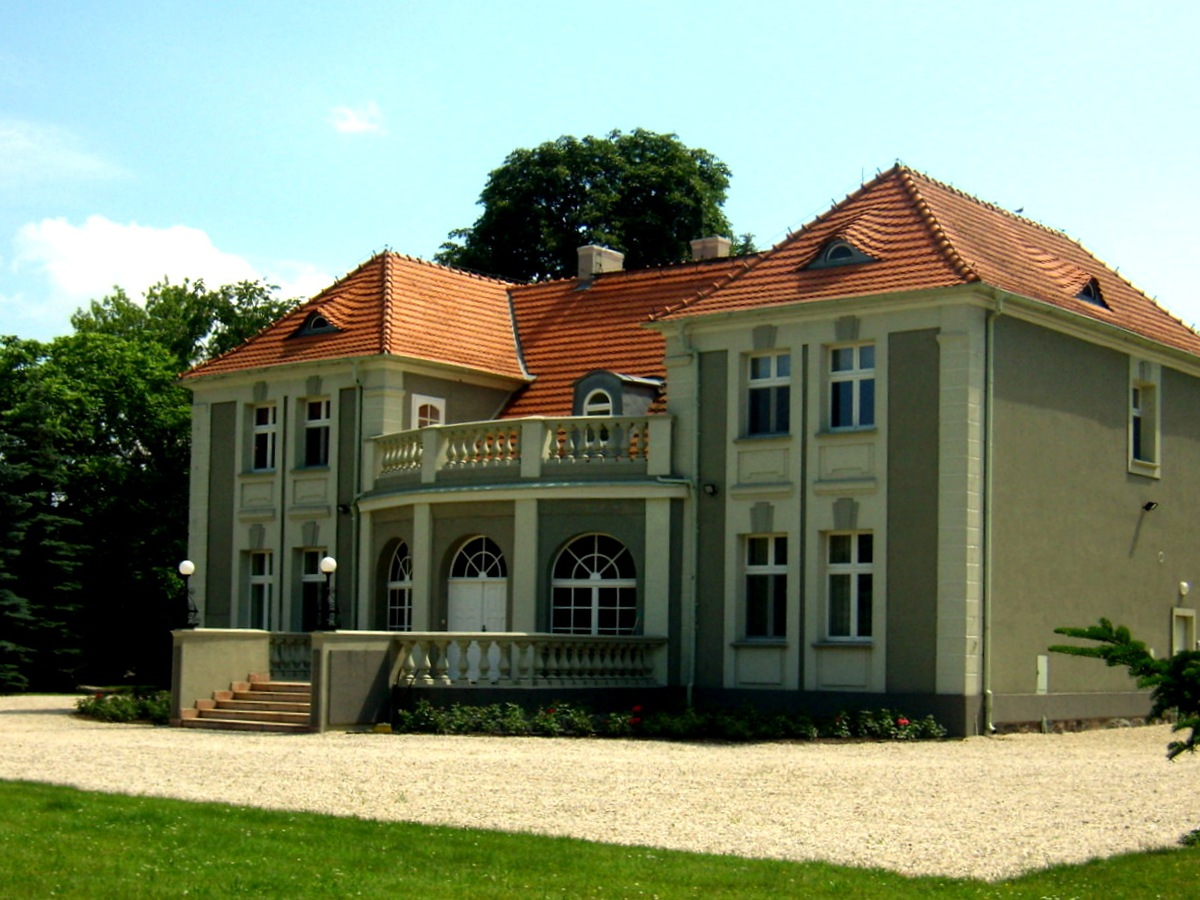
- Palace in Krerowo

- Location within Poland
- Coordinates: 52°17′N 17°11′E
- Country: Poland
- Voivodeship: Greater Poland
- County: Poznań
- Gmina: Kleszczewo
- Population: 274
- Time zone: UTC+1 (CET)
  - Summer (DST): UTC+2 (CEST)
- Vehicle registration: PZ

Krerowo [krɛˈrɔvɔ] is a village in the administrative district of Gmina Kleszczewo, within Poznań County, Greater Poland Voivodeship, in west-central Poland.

== History ==
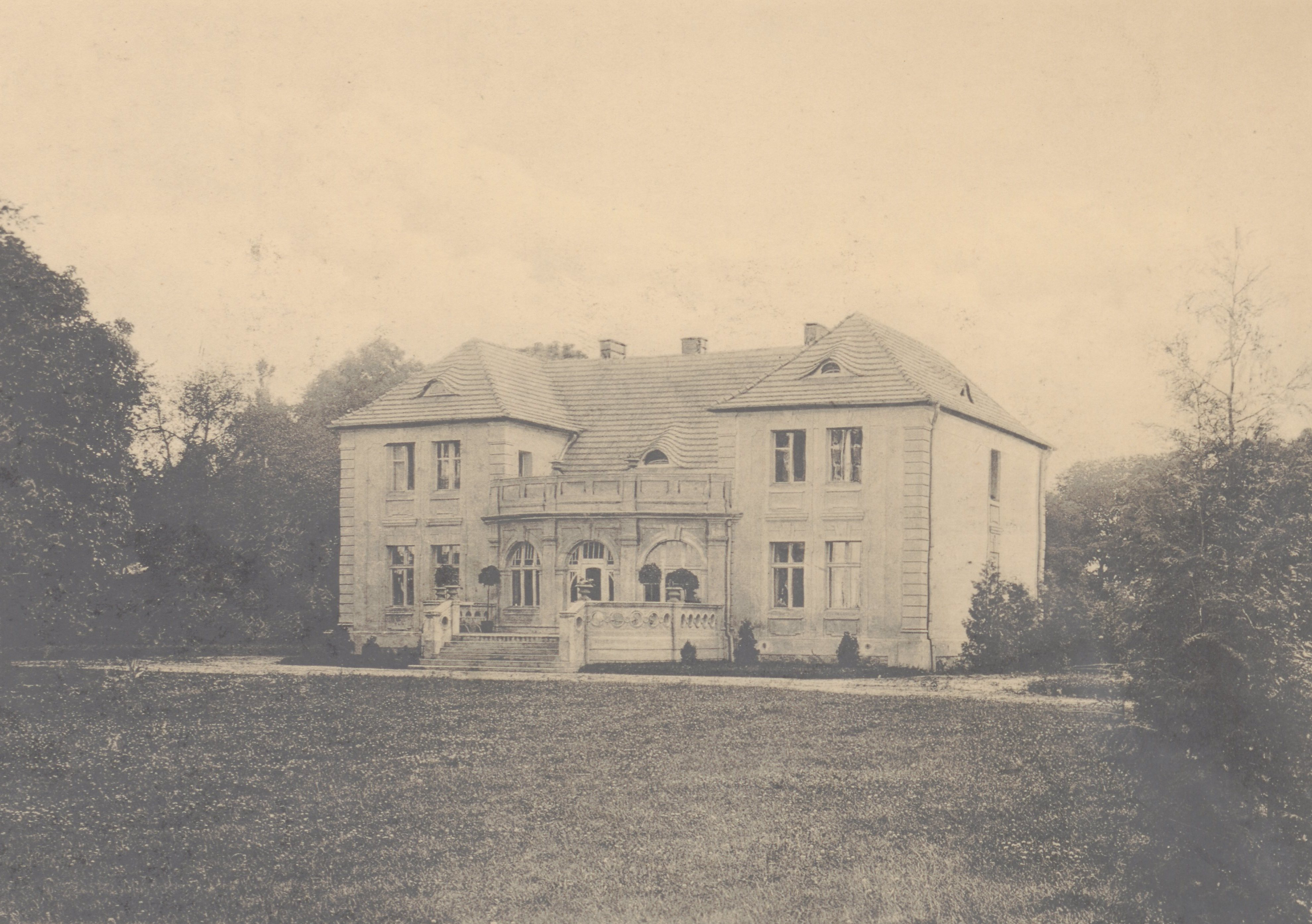
Krerowo Palace in the early 20th century

Krerowo was a private church village, administratively located in the Pyzdry County in the Kalisz Voivodeship in the Greater Poland Province.

During the German occupation of Poland (World War II), a local teacher was among the victims of a massacre of Poles committed by the Germans in nearby Środa Wielkopolska on 20 October 1939 as part of the genocidal Intelligenzaktion campaign. In 1940–1941, the occupiers carried out expulsions of Poles, whose houses and farms were then handed over to German colonists as part of the Lebensraum policy. Poles expelled in 1940 were placed in a transit camp in Łódź and then deported to the General Government in the more eastern part of German-occupied Poland, whereas Poles expelled in 1941 were enslaved as forced labour and sent either to Germany or to new German colonists in the county.

== Sights ==
The landmarks of Krerowo are the local palace and the Gothic Saint John the Baptist church. There is also a monument of Polish poet Adam Mickiewicz from 1935.

== Transport ==
The A2 motorway runs nearby, north of the village.
