= Wysoki Kościół =

- Village
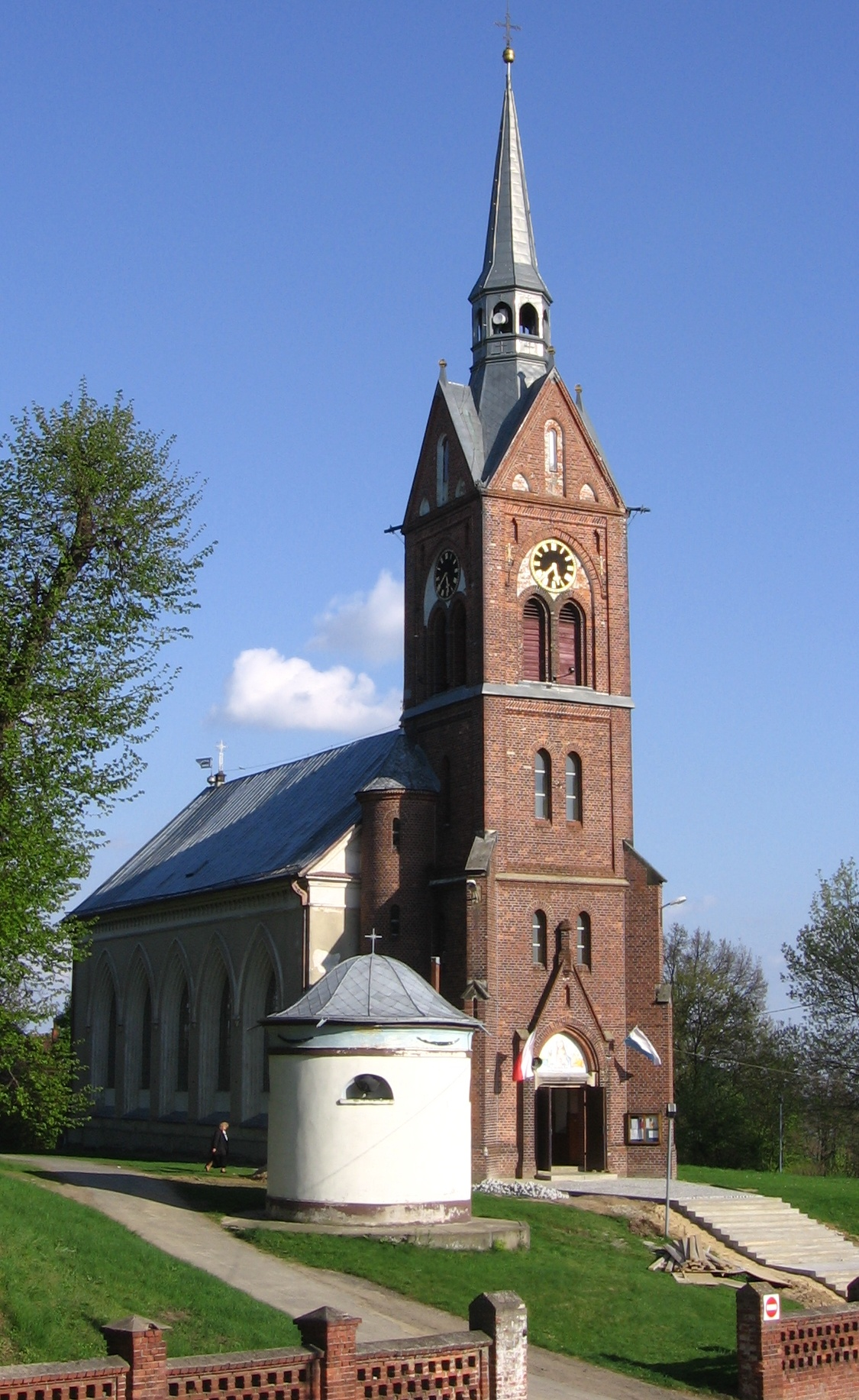

- Location within Poland
- Coordinates: 51°15′55″N 17°03′08″E
- Country: Poland
- Voivodeship: Lower Silesian
- County: Trzebnica
- Gmina: Wisznia Mała

Wysoki Kościół [vɨˈsɔki ˈkɔɕt͡ɕuu̯] is a village in the administrative district of Gmina Wisznia Mała, within Trzebnica County, Lower Silesian Voivodeship, in south-western Poland.
