= Tulce =

- Village
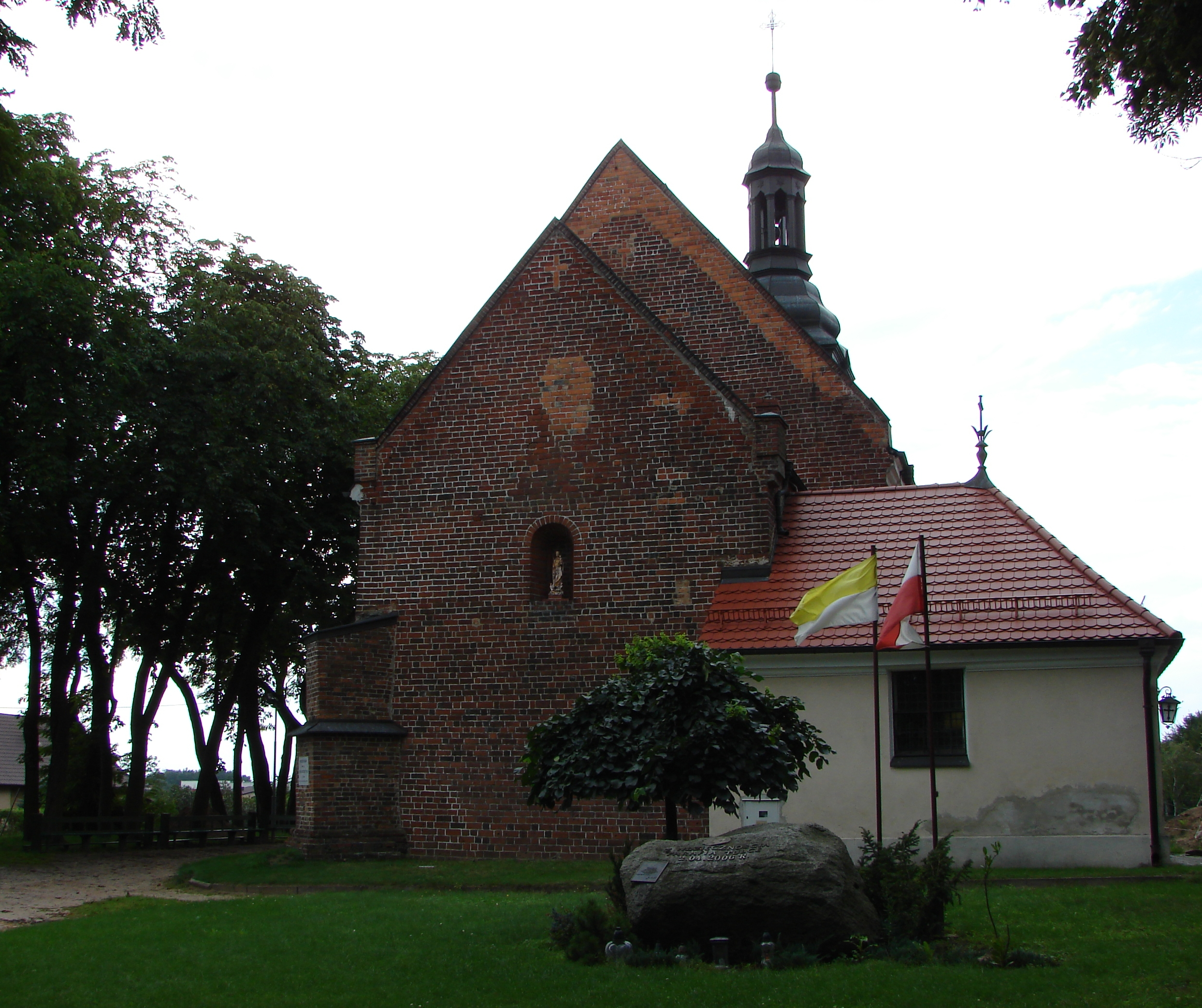
- Church of Virgin Mary

- Location within Poland
- Coordinates: 52°21′N 17°5′E
- Country: Poland
- Voivodeship: Greater Poland
- County: Poznań
- Gmina: Kleszczewo
- Population: 1,842
- Website: http://www.tulce.com

Tulce [ˈtult͡sɛ] is a village in the administrative district of Gmina Kleszczewo, within Poznań County, Greater Poland Voivodeship, in west-central Poland. There is the church of Virgin Mary, founded in first half of the 13th century by noble family Łodzia Coat of Arms.
