= Ozorowice =

- Village
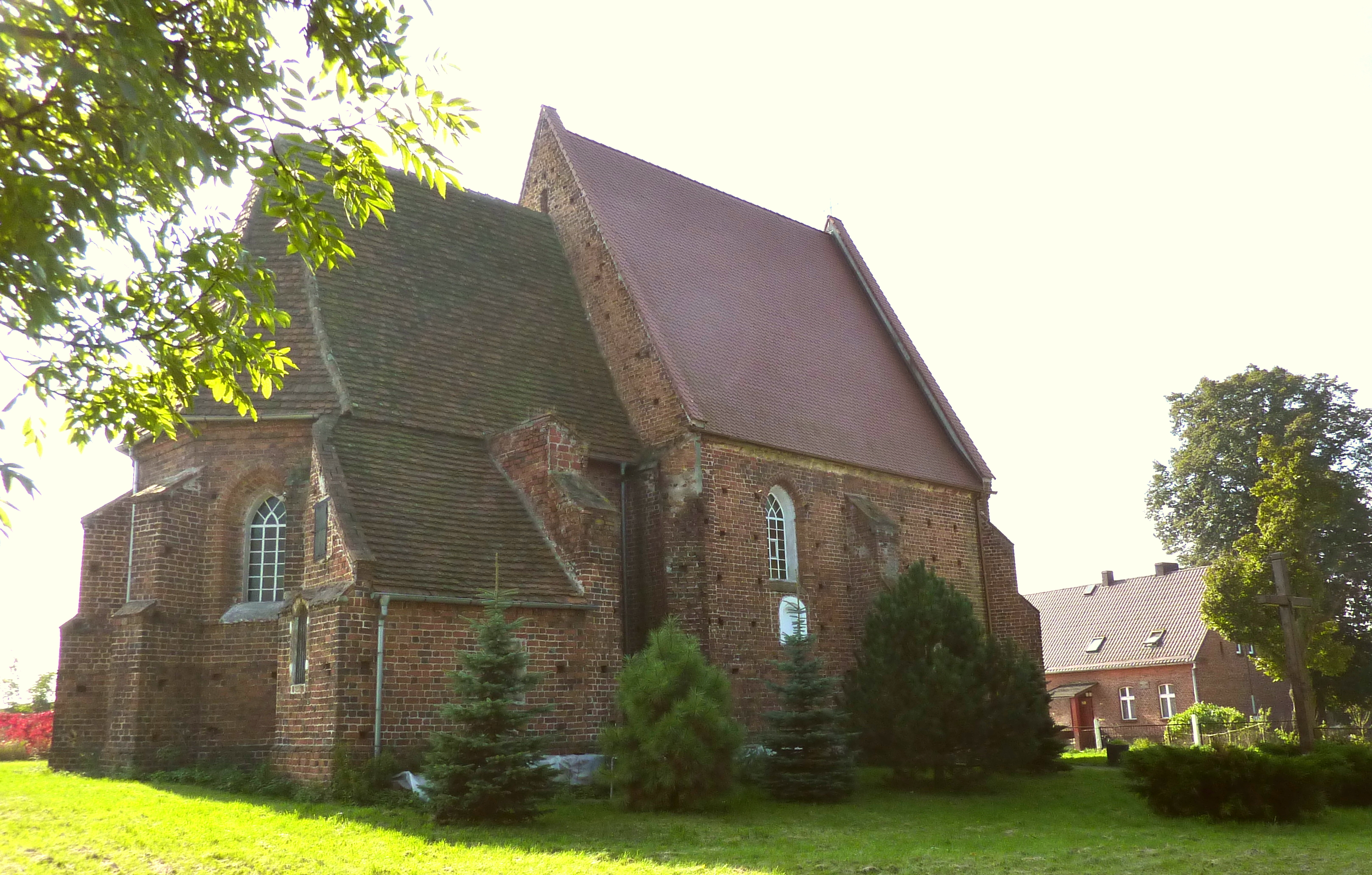
- Kościół św. Jana Chrzciciela Ozorowice

- Location within Poland
- Coordinates: 51°15′N 16°59′E
- Country: Poland
- Voivodeship: Lower Silesian
- County: Trzebnica
- Gmina: Wisznia Mała

Ozorowice [ɔzɔrɔˈvit͡sɛ] is a village in the administrative district of Gmina Wisznia Mała, within Trzebnica County, Lower Silesian Voivodeship, in south-western Poland.
