= Malin, Poland =

Malin
- Village
- Location within Poland
- Coordinates: 51°13′08″N 17°03′51″E
- Country: Poland
- Voivodeship: Lower Silesian
- County: Trzebnica
- Gmina: Wisznia Mała
- Time zone: UTC+1 (CET)
  - Summer (DST): UTC+2 (CEST)
- Vehicle registration: DTR

Malin [ˈmalin] is a village in the administrative district of Gmina Wisznia Mała, within Trzebnica County, Lower Silesian Voivodeship, in south-western Poland.

The name of the village is of Polish origin and comes from the word mały, which means "small".
