= Komorniki, Gmina Kleszczewo =

Komorniki
- Village
- Location within Poland
- Coordinates: 52°20′02″N 17°06′58″E
- Country: Poland
- Voivodeship: Greater Poland
- County: Poznań
- Gmina: Kleszczewo

Komorniki [kɔmɔrˈniki] is a village in the administrative district of Gmina Kleszczewo, within Poznań County, Greater Poland Voivodeship, in west-central Poland.
