= Gmina Wisznia Mała =

Gmina Wisznia Mała Wisznia Mała Commune
- Gmina
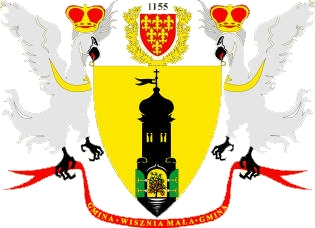
- Coat of arms
- Interactive map of Gmina Wisznia Mała
- Coordinates (Wisznia Mała): 51°15′N 17°2′E
- Country: Poland
- Voivodeship: Lower Silesian
- County: Trzebnica
- Seat: Wisznia Mała

Area
  - Total: 103.33 km^{2} (39.90 sq mi)

Population (2019-06-30)
  - Total: 10,482
  - Density: 101.44/km^{2} (262.73/sq mi)
- Website: https://www.wiszniamala.pl

Gmina Wisznia Mała is a rural gmina (administrative district) in Trzebnica County, Lower Silesian Voivodeship, in south-western Poland. Its seat is the village of Wisznia Mała. It is part of the Wrocław metropolitan area.

The gmina covers an area of 103.33 square kilometres (39.9 sq mi), and as of 2019, its total population was 10,482.

== Neighbouring gminas ==
Gmina Wisznia Mała is bordered by the town of Wrocław and the gminas of Długołęka, Oborniki Śląskie and Trzebnica.

== Villages ==
The gmina contains the villages of Gaj, Kryniczno, Krzyżanowice, Ligota Piękna, Machnice, Malin, Mienice, Ozorowice, Pierwoszów, Piotrkowiczki, Psary, Rogoż, Strzeszów, Szewce, Szymanów, Wisznia Mała and Wysoki Kościół.
