= Kleszczewo, Poznań County =

Kleszczewo
- Village
- Location within Poland
- Coordinates: 52°20′N 17°11′E
- Country: Poland
- Voivodeship: Greater Poland
- County: Poznań
- Gmina: Kleszczewo
- Population: 430

Kleszczewo [klɛʂˈt͡ʂɛvɔ] is a village in Poznań County, Greater Poland Voivodeship, in west-central Poland. It is the seat of the gmina (administrative district) called Gmina Kleszczewo.
