= Zimin, Poland =

Zimin
- Village
- Location within Poland
- Coordinates: 52°18′N 17°9′E
- Country: Poland
- Voivodeship: Greater Poland
- County: Poznań
- Gmina: Kleszczewo
- Population: 300

Zimin [ˈʑimin] is a village in the administrative district of Gmina Kleszczewo, within Poznań County, Greater Poland Voivodeship, in west-central Poland.
