= Strumiany, Poznań County =

Strumiany
- Village
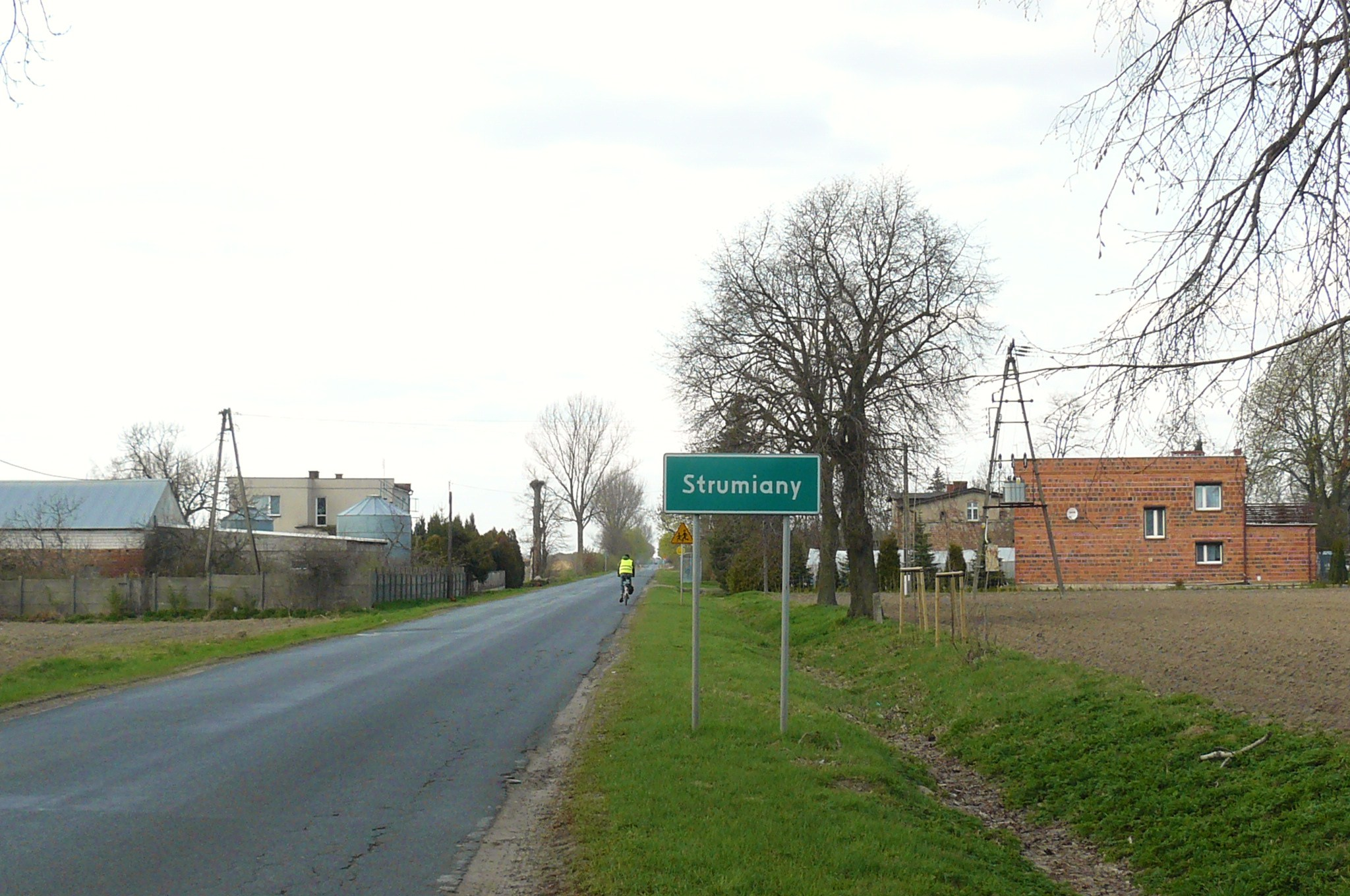

- Location within Poland
- Coordinates: 52°23′46″N 17°14′15″E
- Country: Poland
- Voivodeship: Greater Poland
- County: Poznań
- Gmina: Kostrzyn

Strumiany [struˈmjanɨ] is a village in the administrative district of Gmina Kostrzyn, within Poznań County, Greater Poland Voivodeship, in west-central Poland.
