= Markowice, Greater Poland Voivodeship =

Markowice
- Village
- Location within Poland
- Coordinates: 52°18′N 17°14′E
- Country: Poland
- Voivodeship: Greater Poland
- County: Poznań
- Gmina: Kleszczewo
- Time zone: UTC+1 (CET)
  - Summer (DST): UTC+2 (CEST)
- Vehicle registration: PZ

Markowice [markɔˈvit͡sɛ] is a village in the administrative district of Gmina Kleszczewo, within Poznań County, Greater Poland Voivodeship, in west-central Poland.

== History ==
Markowice was a private village of Polish nobility, administratively located in the Pyzdry County in the Kalisz Voivodeship in the Greater Poland Province.

During the German occupation of Poland (World War II), in 1940, the occupiers carried out expulsions of Poles, whose houses and farms were then handed over to German colonists as part of the Lebensraum policy. Expelled Poles were placed in a transit camp in Łódź and then deported to the General Government in the more eastern part of German-occupied Poland.

== Transport ==
The A2 motorway runs nearby, north of the village.
