= Kryniczno, Trzebnica County =

Kryniczno
- Village
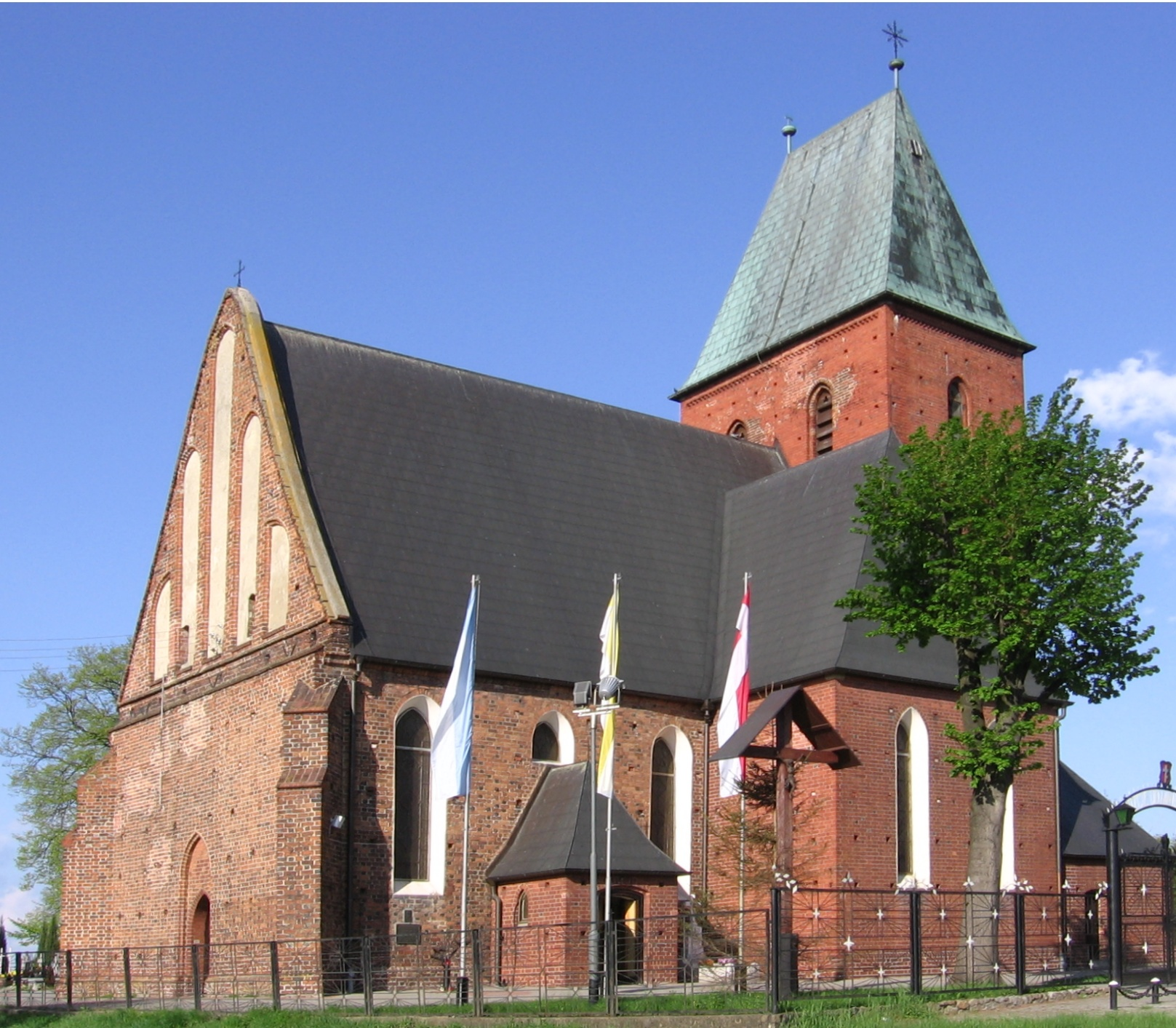
- Saint Stanislaus church in Kryniczno

- Location within Poland
- Coordinates: 51°12′28″N 17°02′20″E
- Country: Poland
- Voivodeship: Lower Silesian
- County: Trzebnica
- Gmina: Wisznia Mała

Kryniczno [krɨˈnit͡ʂnɔ] is a village in the administrative district of Gmina Wisznia Mała, within Trzebnica County, Lower Silesian Voivodeship, in south-western Poland.
