= Gruczno =

Village in Kociewie

- Village
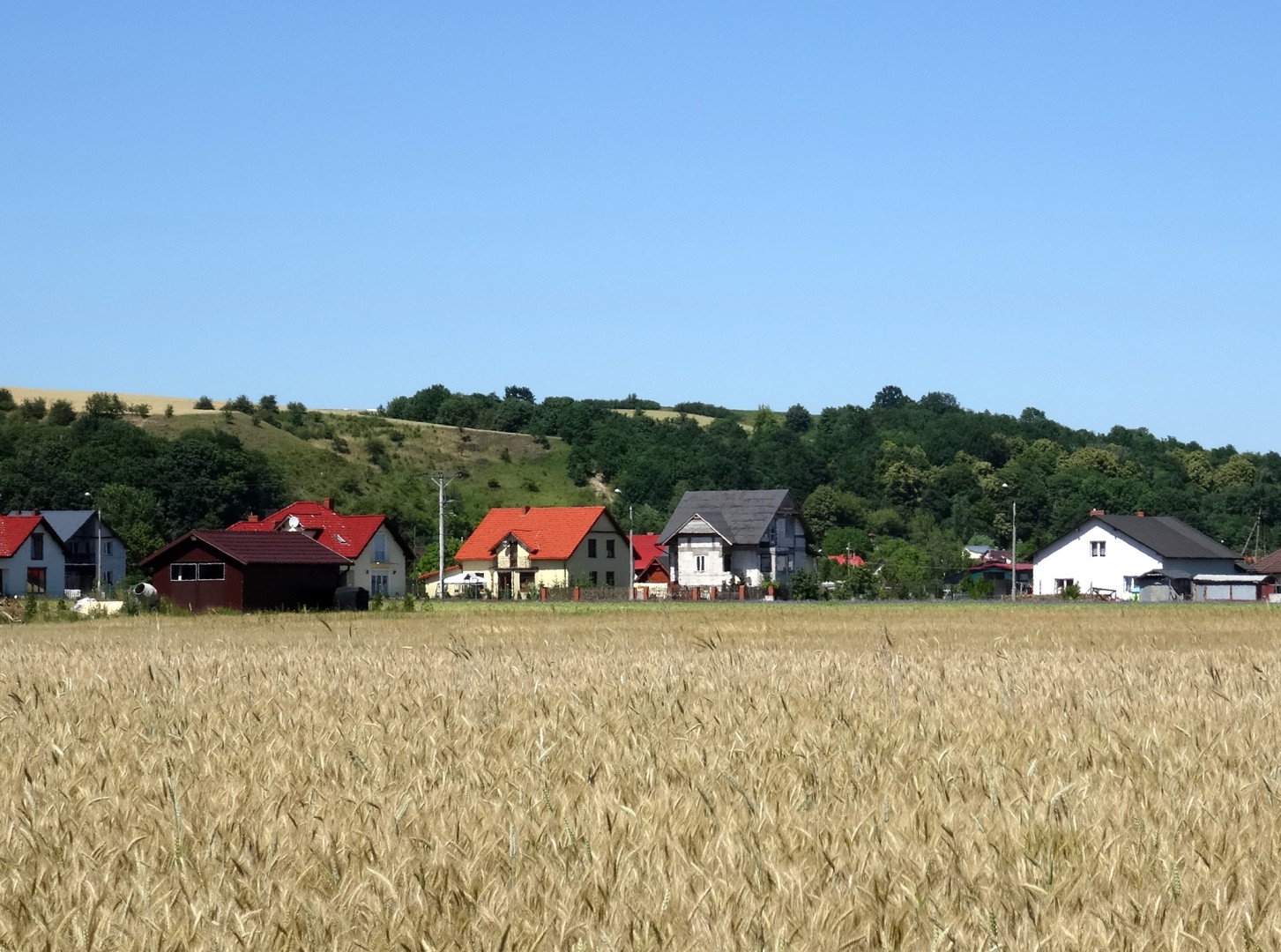

- Location within Poland
- Coordinates: 53°21′N 18°19′E
- Country: Poland
- Voivodeship: Kuyavian-Pomeranian
- County: Świecie
- Gmina: Świecie
- Population: 1,300
- Time zone: UTC+1 (CET)
  - Summer (DST): UTC+2 (CEST)
- Vehicle registration: CSW

Gruczno [ˈɡrut͡ʂnɔ] is a village in the administrative district of Gmina Świecie, within Świecie County, Kuyavian-Pomeranian Voivodeship, in north-central Poland.

== History ==
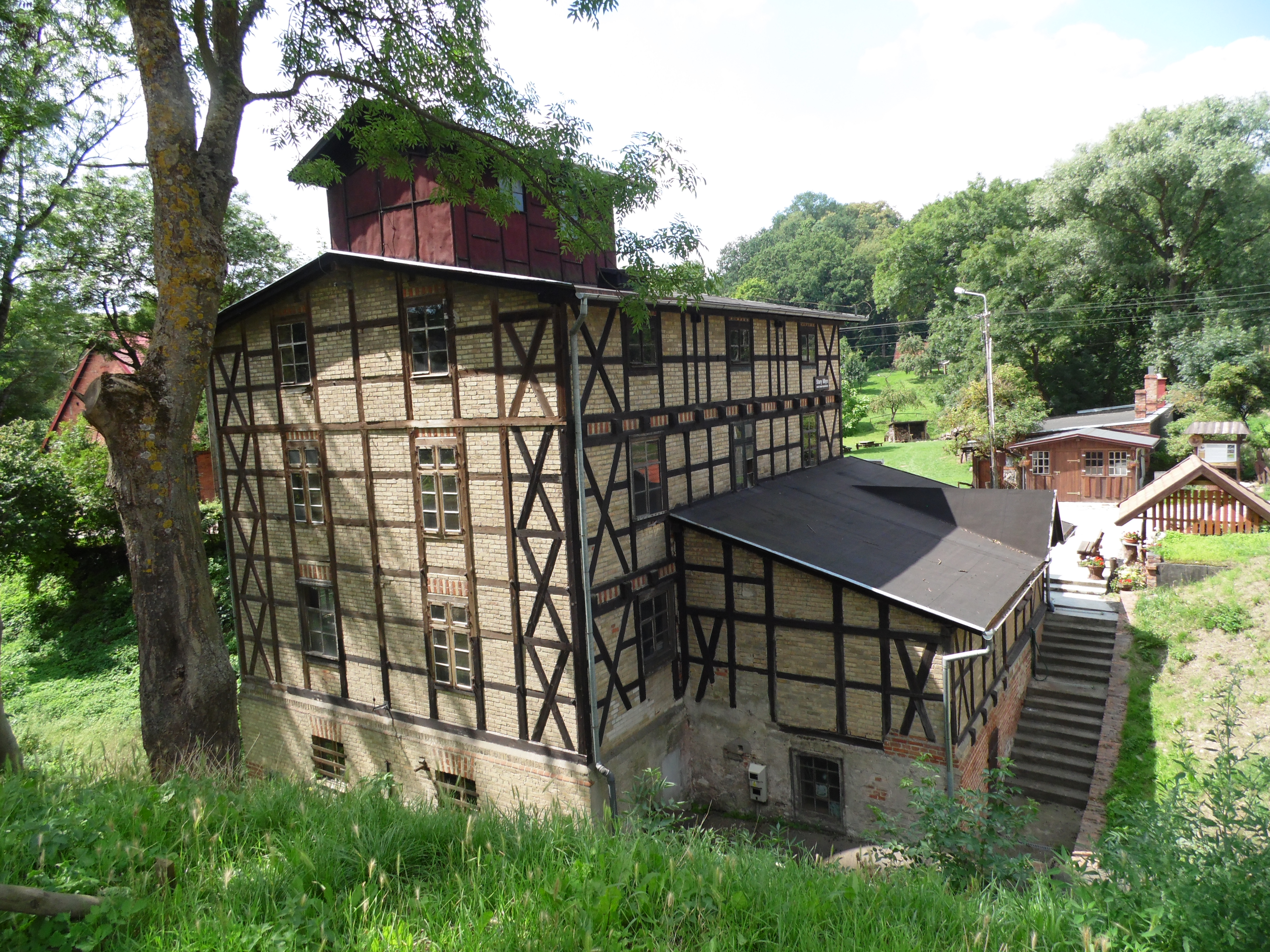
Historic timber framed mill

Gruczno was the site of a medieval Polish stronghold. The name of the village comes from the Polish word gród, which means "stronghold". During the fragmentation period, it was located within the Duchy of Pomerania (eastern) within the fragmented Polish realm. The oldest known mention of a parish priest in Gruczno comes from 1238. In 1290, Duke Mestwin II sold the village to the Archbishop of Gniezno. Gruczno was visited by several Archbishops of Gniezno, and it was administered by the Archdiocese until the late-18th-century Partitions of Poland, when it was annexed by Prussia. Following World War I, Poland regained independence and control of the village.

During the German occupation of Poland (World War II), Gruczno was one of the sites of executions of Poles, carried out by the Germans in 1939 as part of the Intelligenzaktion. In 1940–1941, the occupiers also carried out expulsions of Poles, whose houses and farms were then handed over to German colonists as part of the Lebensraum policy.

== Sports ==
The local football club is Wisła Gruczno. It competes in the lower leagues.
