= Lubcz, Kuyavian-Pomeranian Voivodeship =

Lubcz
- Village
- Location within Poland
- Coordinates: 52°41′23″N 17°40′57″E
- Country: Poland
- Voivodeship: Kuyavian-Pomeranian
- County: Żnin
- Gmina: Rogowo
- Population: 375
- Website: http://www.lubcz.republika.pl

Lubcz [lupt͡ʂ] is a village in the administrative district of Gmina Rogowo, within Żnin County, Kuyavian-Pomeranian Voivodeship, in north-central Poland.
