= Gmina Kleszczewo =

Gmina Kleszczewo Kleszczewo Commune
- Gmina
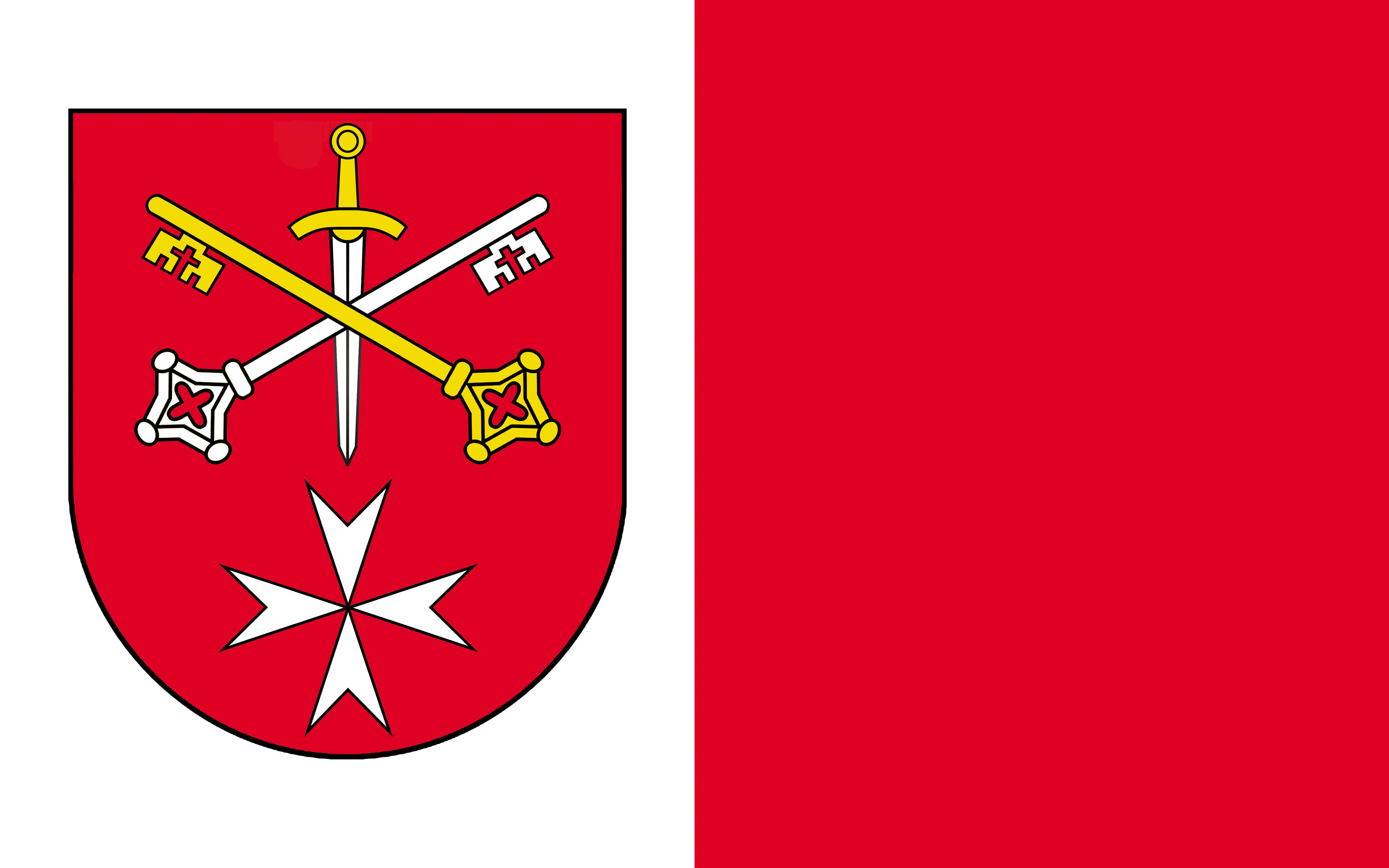
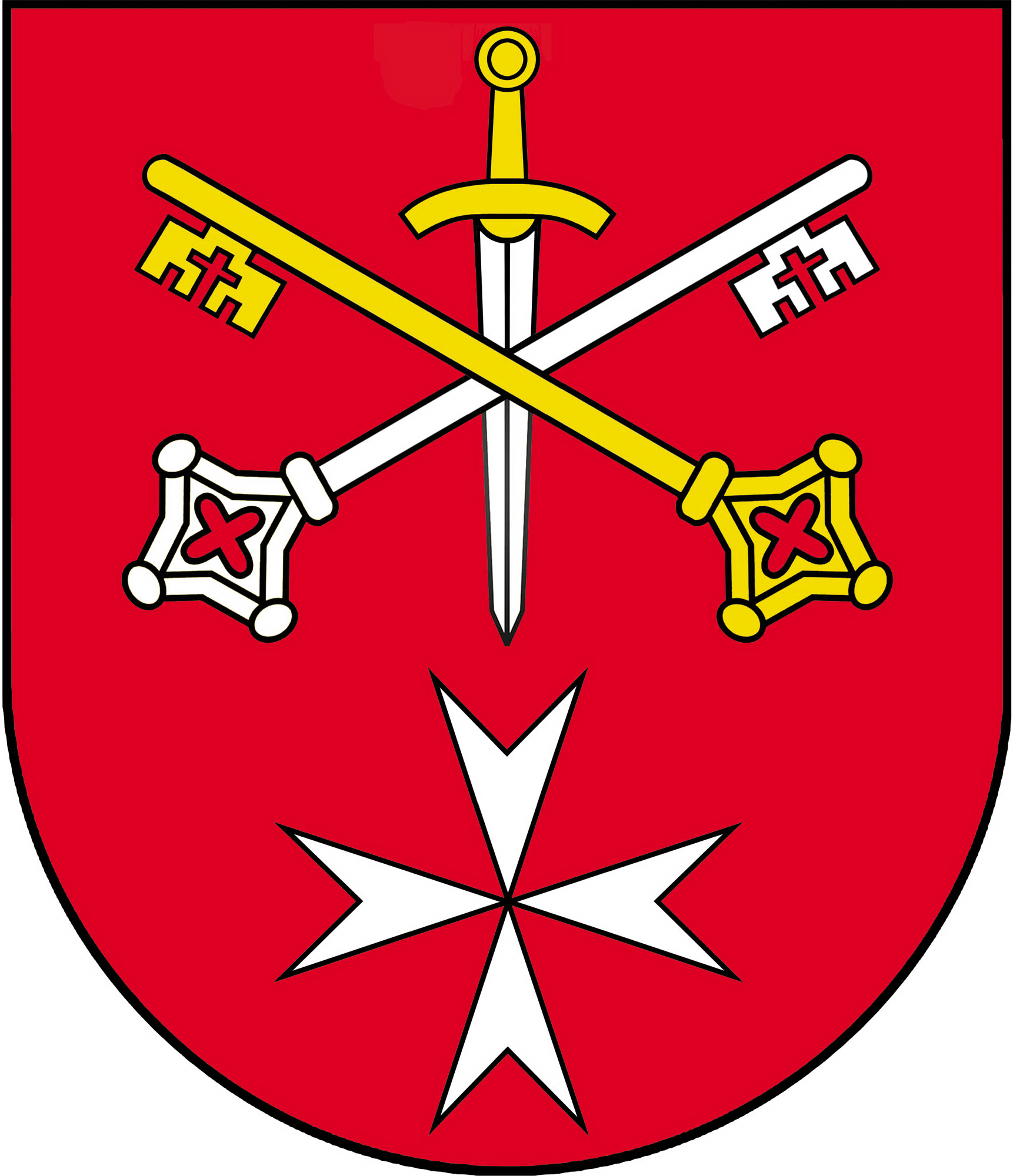
- Flag Coat of arms
- Interactive map of Gmina Kleszczewo
- Coordinates (Kleszczewo): 52°20′N 17°11′E
- Country: Poland
- Voivodeship: Greater Poland
- County: Poznań County
- Seat: Kleszczewo

Area
  - Total: 74.77 km^{2} (28.87 sq mi)

Population (2006)
  - Total: 5,436
  - Density: 72.70/km^{2} (188.3/sq mi)
- Website: http://www.kleszczewo.pl

Gmina Kleszczewo is a rural gmina (administrative district) in Poznań County, Greater Poland Voivodeship, in west-central Poland. Its seat is the village of Kleszczewo, which lies approximately 20 kilometres (12 mi) east of the regional capital Poznań.

The gmina covers an area of 74.77 square kilometres (28.9 sq mi), and as of 2006 its total population is 5,436.

== Villages ==
Gmina Kleszczewo contains the villages and settlements of Bugaj, Bylin, Gowarzewo, Kleszczewo, Komorniki, Krerowo, Krzyżowniki, Lipowice, Markowice, Nagradowice, Poklatki, Śródka, Szewce, Tanibórz, Tulce and Zimin.

== Neighbouring gminas ==
Gmina Kleszczewo is bordered by the city of Poznań and by the gminas of Kórnik, Kostrzyn, Środa Wielkopolska and Swarzędz.
