= Świecko =

- Village
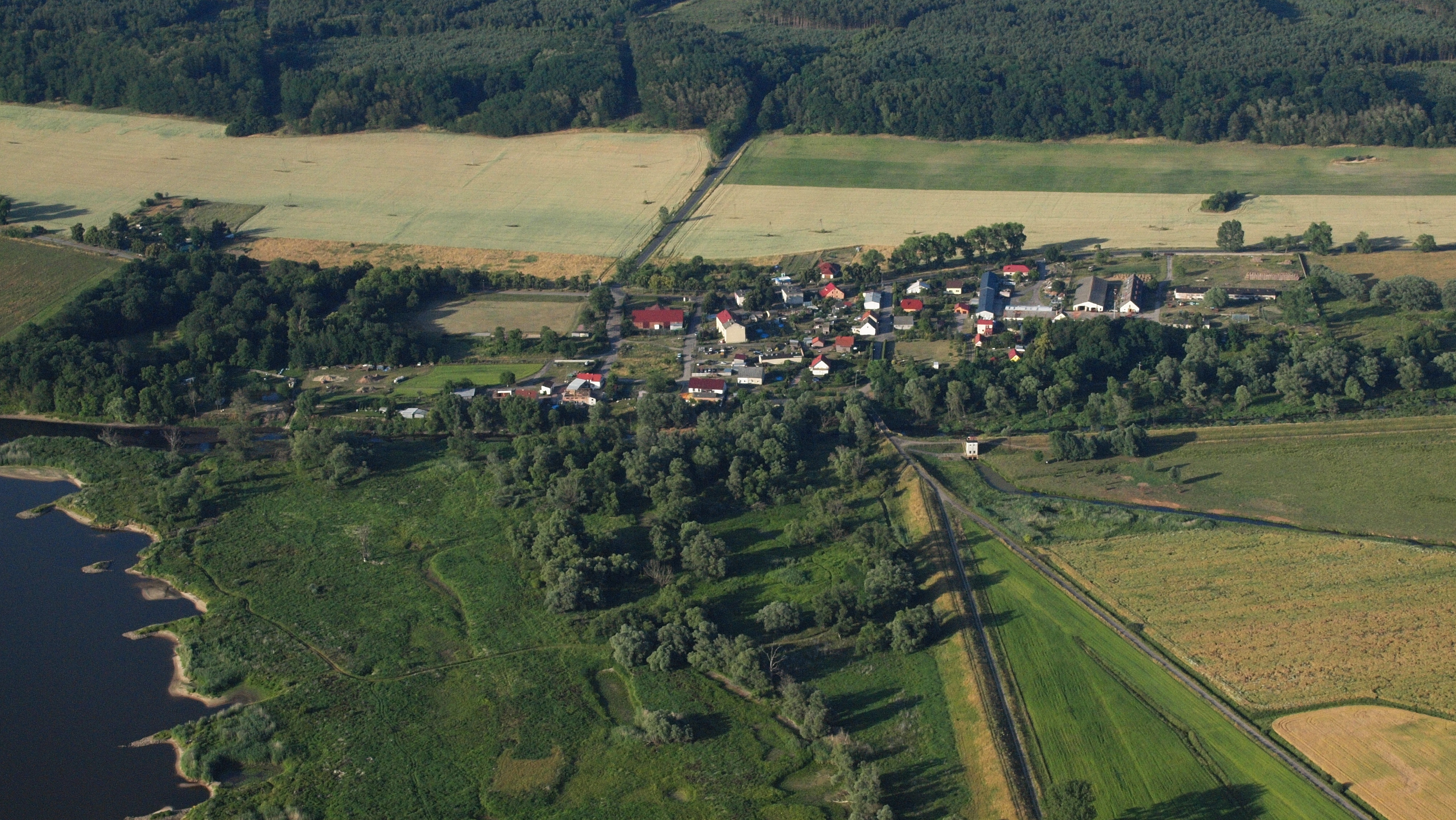
- Bird's eye view of the village

- Location within Poland
- Coordinates: 52°18′N 14°36′E
- Country: Poland
- Voivodeship: Lubusz
- County: Słubice
- Gmina: Słubice

Population (2016)
  - Total: 183
- Time zone: UTC+1 (CET)
  - Summer (DST): UTC+2 (CEST)
- Postal code: 69-100
- Vehicle registration: FSL

Świecko (Polish: [ˈɕfjɛt͡skɔ]) is a village in the administrative district of Gmina Słubice, within Słubice County, Lubusz Voivodeship, in western Poland, close to Frankfurt an der Oder on the German border.

== Transport ==
The important national road 2,^{A} which is part of the European route E30, crosses the border near the village. It connects with the German A12 autobahn at Frankfurt an der Oder, where the two roads are linked by a motorway bridge across the River Oder.

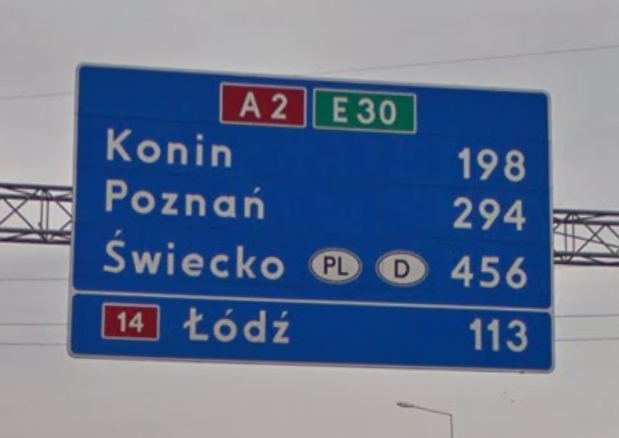
Traffic sign located on motorway A2, west of Warsaw, showing the distance to the Świecko former border crossing.

All border controls at this crossing ceased as of 21 December 2007 when Poland joined the Schengen Area.

== History ==
The village is located within the historic Lubusz Land, which formed part of Poland since the establishment of the state by the Piast dynasty in the 10th century. In 1354 the municipal authorities of the city of Frankfurt (Oder) bought the village called Sweyt at the time from its owners Nicolaus and Hermann von Lossow and added it to the property districts of the city treasury. With the purchase, Frankfurt acquired a settlement with 12 hoofs area, 17 farmers, ten with half a hoof each, the remaining seven with one hoof land each, and six cottages. The rural field mark had a total area of 2810 acres. Since the city of Frankfurt on the right bank of the Oder also owned the four neighboring villages Kunowice, Kunice, Rybocice and Drzecin and the five villages together had the property of a manor, the city council was entitled to a seat of knighthood in the state parliament.

In 1477 an army under Hans von Sagan passed through the village and plundered it. In 1516 there were only six farmers left, but 13 cottagers. In 1651 there was a school in town.

In the 18th century, the village became part of Prussia. In 1759, during the Seven Years' War, the village was burned down by the Russian army in 1759 during the Battle of Kunersdorf (Kunowice). Only the forge survived the fire. In 1763 Mattig became a village mayor. With a brief interruption, this office remained in the hands of this family until 1852. If you compare the situation with the other council villages in Frankfurt, this is very unusual. Since the 18th century in particular, the Schulzen changed frequently, as the position became increasingly unattractive due to fewer privileges. Only Drzecin (then officially Trettin), which also belongs to Frankfurt, was able to show a similar resistance. In 1785 the village had 18 farmers, 13 cottagers, nine householders, a shepherd, three shepherds, a blacksmith, a forester and a schoolmaster. In November 1806 the place was occupied by the French army, and the residents had to provide shelter and care for soldiers. In 1820 there were 50 residential and 60 farm houses as well as a mill. In 1838 a trade table for the village listed three residents, eight full farmers, ten half-farmers, 13 cottagers, eleven Büdner, 14 old-Altenteil and three shepherds.

On June 13, 1855, a major fire destroyed 20 houses, 16 barns, 31 stables and three sheds. In 1871 the village became part of the German Empire, and in 1873 it came to the Weststernberg district of the Frankfurt administrative district in the province of Brandenburg as part of an administrative reform. An inspection report noted in 1914 about the school school house for needs sufficient, whereby it can be assumed on the basis of knowledge of the financial situation and the situation of the schools in the area that the equipment was very limited. In 1929 the school received a radio system for classroom use.

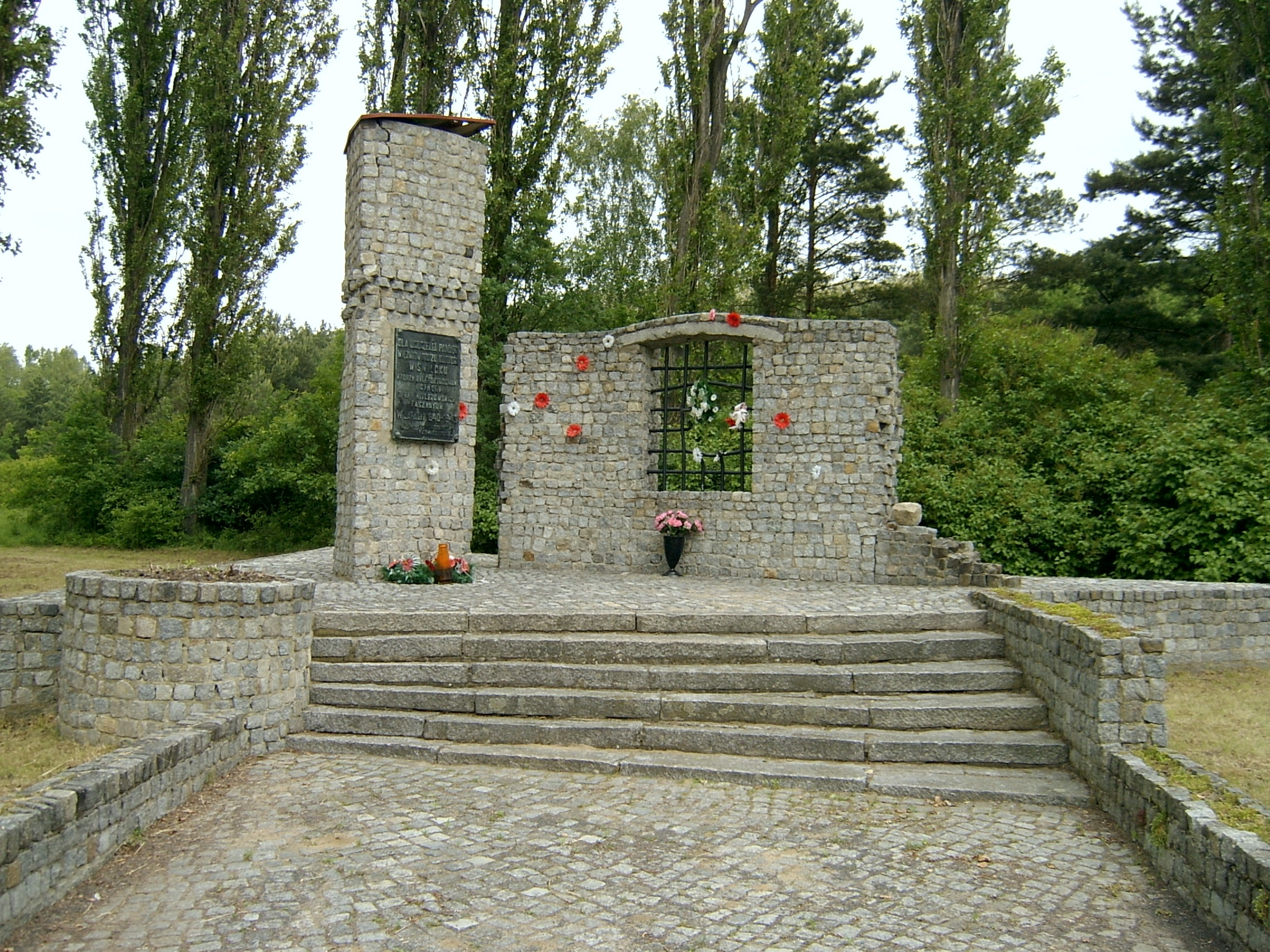
Memorial to the victims of the Nazi German forced labour camp

During World War II, the Oderblick labor education camp (Arbeitserziehungslager Oderblick) was established near the village by Nazi Germany in October 1940. Its prisoners were mostly Poles, but also Belgians, French, Bulgarians, Dutch, Yugoslavs, Russians, Ukrainians and Italians. The camp on the site of the former workers' camp for the construction of the motorway was built for 400 prisoners and was under the Gestapo control center in Frankfurt (Oder). At least 11,500 prisoners could have passed through the camp. Camp commandant was SS-Obersturmführer Schneider, deputy camp commandant SS-Stabsscharführer Willi Dietrich. Since the camp was also used as an extended prison, there was a women's section in which German women were held. Their treatment was better than that of the other inmates.

In autumn of 1941 typhus broke out and the camp was completely isolated until May 7, 1942. Almost all the prisoners at the time died. New prisoners were brought in since May 1942. The prisoners were forced to exhausting labour, and were subjected to malnutrition, cold, mental and physical abuse, accidents at work, diseases, and tortures and murder by German guards. Some prisoners even committed suicide. According to the survivors, many people died in the camp every week or even every day. In the final stages of the war, the Germans took blood from prisoners for wounded German soldiers. The liquidation of the camp began on January 30, 1945, when 1,600 prisoners were sent on a death march to the Sachsenhausen concentration camp. The number of prisoners who survived the march is not known. Some of the survivors were used as forced labour in the Heinkel factory in Potsdam. On January 31, 1945, around 70 sick prisoners were locked up in the sick barrack and burned alive. The other barracks were also burned, and probably all the documents relating to the camp as well. On March 16, 1945, 29 prisoners reached the Buchenwald concentration camp. Soon after the liquidation of the camp, it was the stopping point of a death march of prisoners of various nationalities from the dissolved camp in Żabikowo to Sachsenhausen.

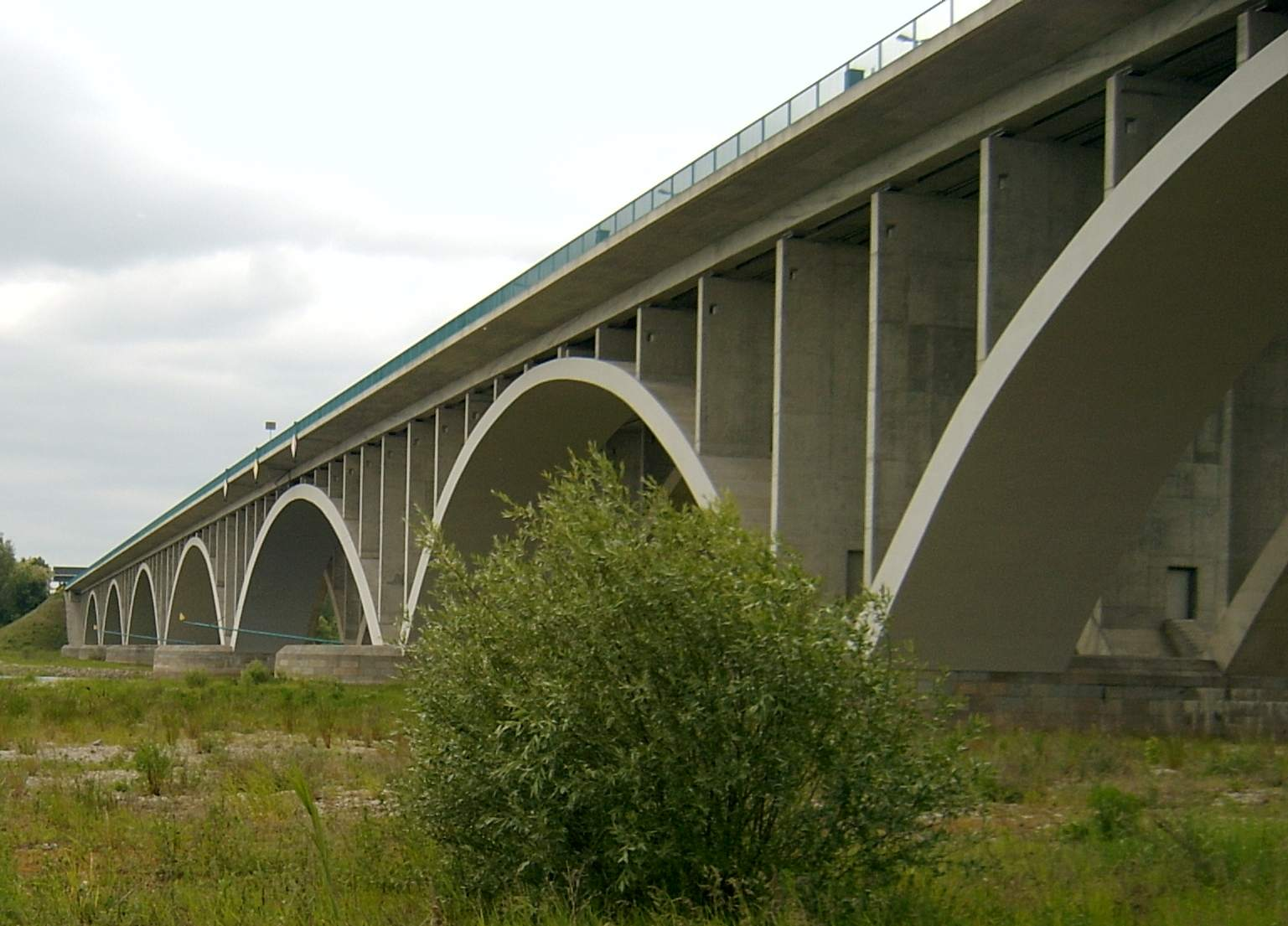
Bridge at the Polish-German border in Świecko

At the end of the Second World War, on February 2, 1945, the residents of the village fled towards Frankfurt from the approaching Red Army. On February 3, the 77th Rifle Division of the Soviet 69th Army took the place without a fight. After the end of the war, the village, along with the lands east of the Oder–Neisse line became again part of Poland. The abandoned village was resettled by Polish civilians. The locals who had fled were prevented from returning by Polish militiamen. The village was renamed Świecko. In 1977 a memorial to the victims of the Nazi German labor camp was built.

== Gallery ==
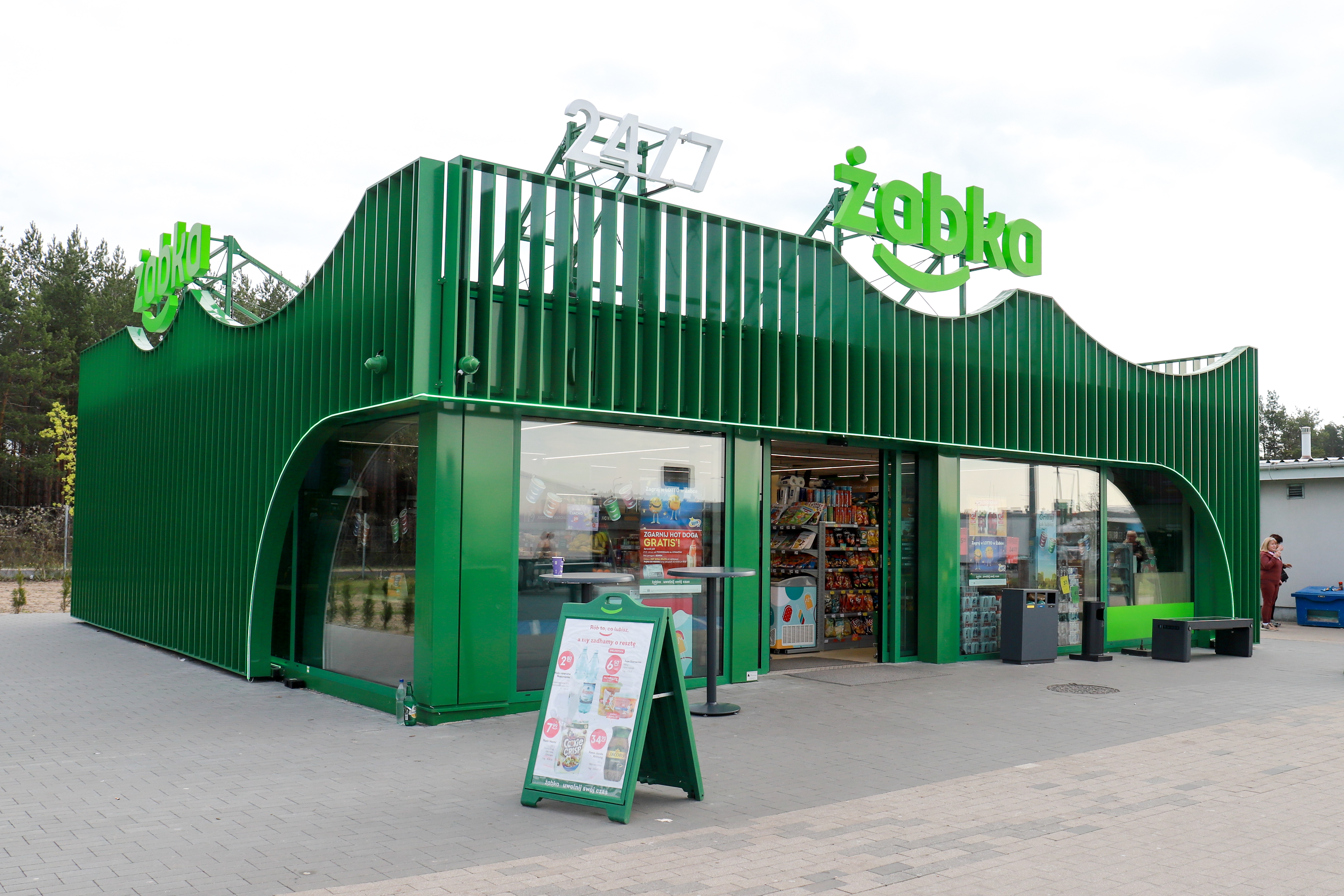

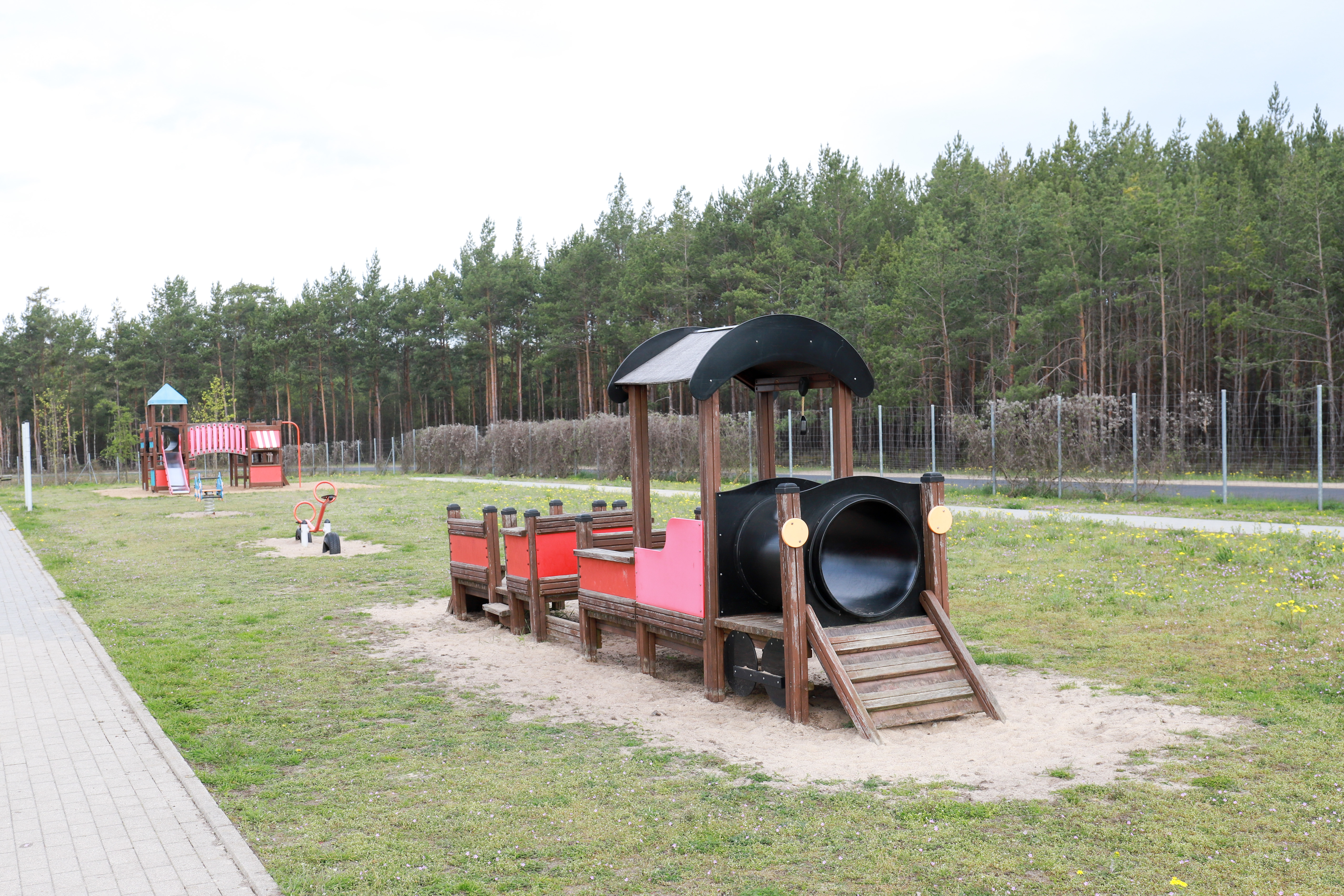

== Notes ==
^A Currently the stretch near country border is signed as a national road. It will be incorporated into the motorway in the future, presumably after constructing a bypass of the former border crossing area.
