= National road 2 (Poland) =

National road in Poland

Coordinates: 52°08′46″N 22°13′33″E

National Road 2
- Droga krajowa nr 2

Route information
- Part of E30
- Maintained by GDDKiA
- Length: 672 km (418 mi)
- Existed: 1986–present

Major junctions
- West end: Świecko at the German border
- East end: Terespol at the Belarusian border

Location
- Country: Poland
- Regions: Lubusz Voivodeship; Greater Poland Voivodeship; Łódź Voivodeship; Masovian Voivodeship; Lublin Voivodeship
- Major cities: Poznań, Łódź, Warsaw

Highway system
- National roads in Poland; Voivodeship roads
← DK 1	→ DK 3

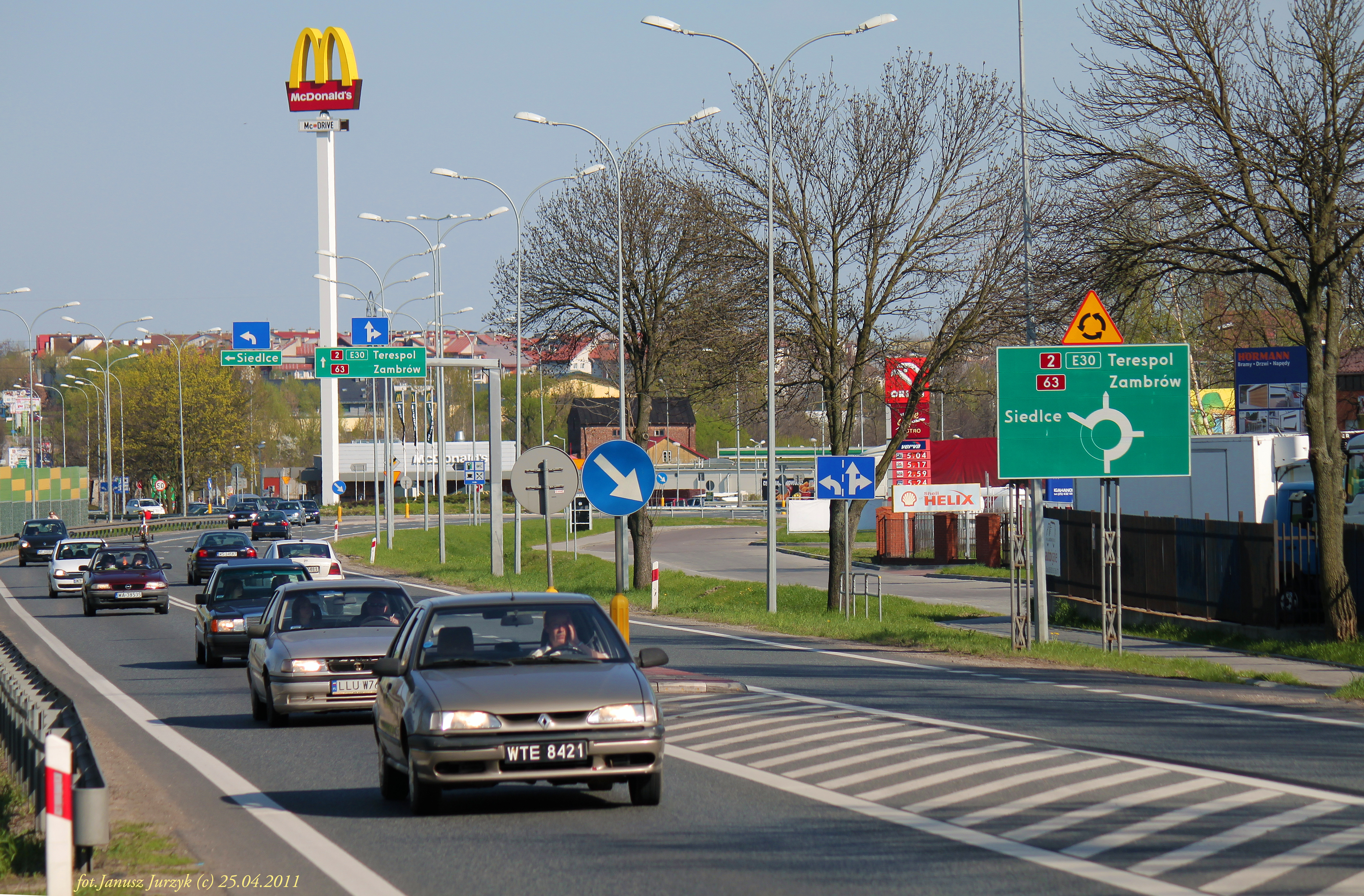
Road 2 in Nowe Iganie

National road 2 (Polish: Droga krajowa nr 2, abbreviated as DK2) is an A-class, S-class and GP-class Polish national road, being part of the European route E30 from Cork (Ireland) to Omsk (Russia). The highway traverses through the Lubusz, Greater Poland, Łódź. Masovian and Lublin voivodeships. It runs latitudinally.

== Permissive axle load ==
On May 1, 2004, the day Poland joined the European Union, the Regulation of Minister of Infrastructure came into force, under which the movement of vehicles with a single axle load of up to 11.5 tonnes (25,000 lb) was allowed, at first on the Poznań (Komorniki junction) – Konin (Modła junction) stretch. Since November 15, 2005, the increased carrying capacity has been extended to the entire length of national road 2.

== Motorway A2 ==
On Świecko–Konotopa and Warsaw-Lubelska–Mińsk Mazowiecki stretches the route has a status of motorway numbered A2. A toll-free alternative road for the motorway is a national road 92, frequently referred to as the "old 2" (Polish: stara dwójka).

== Expressway S2 ==
On the section constituting the Southern Bypass of Warsaw, between Konotopa and Warsaw-Lubelska interchanges, the route has the status of an expressway.

== Numbering history ==
Over the years, the route had various numbering:

Route number		Section	Validity	References	Notes
3		Warsaw – Sochaczew – Łowicz – Kutno – Kostrzyń – Poznań – Pniewy – Skwierzyna – state border (– Berlin)	1921–1930s	Ustawa z dnia 10 grudnia 1920 r. o budowie i utrzymaniu dróg publicznych w Rzeczypospoiltej Polskiej [Act of December 10, 1920 on construction and maintenance of public roads in Republic of Poland], Dz. U., 1921, vol. 6, No. 32	—
17		Warsaw – Błonie – Sochaczew – Łowicz – Kutno – Poznań – state border	1930s–1952	Jaworski, Zygmunt; Świkla, Alojzy; Pastwa, Wacław (1939), Mapa samochodowa Polski (stan dróg) na rok 1939/1940 (in Polish), Tadeusz Musiał; Rozporządzenie Ministra Budownictwa z dnia 26 września 1949 r. w sprawie odległości budynków od niektórych dróg państwowych [Regulation of Ministry of Construction of September 26, 1949 on distance between buildings and some of state roads], Dz. U., 1949, vol. 52, No. 398	—
4		Warsaw – Miłosna – Mińsk Mazowiecki – Kałuszyn – Siedlce – Biała Podlaska – Brześć (state border)	1930s–1952	Jaworski, Zygmunt; Świkla, Alojzy; Pastwa, Wacław (1939), Mapa samochodowa Polski (stan dróg) na rok 1939/1940 (in Polish), Tadeusz Musiał; Rozporządzenie Ministra Budownictwa z dnia 26 września 1949 r. w sprawie odległości budynków od niektórych dróg państwowych [Regulation of Ministry of Construction of September 26, 1949 on distance between buildings and some of state roads], Dz. U., 1949, vol. 52, No. 398	—
R 167		Frankfurt (Oder) – Reppen (Rzepin) – Sternberg (Torzym) – Schwiebus (Świebodzin)	1939 (?)–1945	Der Große Conti-Atlas für Kraftfahrer. Deutsches Reich und Nachbargebiete 1:500 000 mit den Reichsautobahnen (in German), Hannover: Kartographischer Verlag der Continental Caoutchouc-Compagnie G.m.b.H., 1938; DDAC Strassenkarte von Deutschland Masstab 1:1.250.000 (Juli 1941) (in German), München: IRO-Verlag Carl Kremling, 1941	the route number was assigned during the German occupation of Poland; before the World War II Germany–Poland border ran through Trzciel
R 97		Schwiebus (Świebodzin) – Tirschtiegel (Trzciel) – Pinne (Pniewy)	1939 (?)–1945	Der Große Conti-Atlas für Kraftfahrer. Deutsches Reich und Nachbargebiete 1:500 000 mit den Reichsautobahnen (in German), Hannover: Kartographischer Verlag der Continental Caoutchouc-Compagnie G.m.b.H., 1938; DDAC Strassenkarte von Deutschland Masstab 1:1.250.000 (Juli 1941) (in German), München: IRO-Verlag Carl Kremling, 1941	the route number was assigned during the German occupation of Poland; before the World War II Germany–Poland border ran through Trzciel
R 114		Pinne (Pniewy) – Posen (Poznań) – Kostschin (Kostrzyn) – Wreschen (Września) – Grenzhausen (Słupca) – Golina – Konin – Warthbrücken (Koło) – Krośniewice – Kutno – border with General Government	1939 (?)–1945	Der Große Conti-Atlas für Kraftfahrer. Deutsches Reich und Nachbargebiete 1:500 000 mit den Reichsautobahnen (in German), Hannover: Kartographischer Verlag der Continental Caoutchouc-Compagnie G.m.b.H., 1938; DDAC Strassenkarte von Deutschland Masstab 1:1.250.000 (Juli 1941) (in German), München: IRO-Verlag Carl Kremling, 1941; Gauhauptstadt Posen (in German), 1943	the route number was assigned during the German occupation of Poland; before the World War II Germany–Poland border ran through Trzciel
45	E8	state border – Świecko – Rzepin – Świebodzin – Trzciel – Pniewy	national: 1952–14 II 1986; European: 1962–1985	Mapa samochodowa Polski 1:1 000 000 (in Polish), Warsaw: Państwowe Przedsiębiorstwo Wydawnictw Kartograficznych, 1962; Samochodowy atlas Polski 1:500 000 (in Polish), vol. 9, Warsaw: Państwowe Przedsiębiorstwo Wydawnictw Kartograficznych, 1984; Reiseatlas DDR mit ČSSR, Polen, UDSSR, Ungarn, Rumänien, Bulgarien, Berlin/Leipzig, DDR: VEB Tourist Verlag, 1977, p. 37	between Łowicz and Warsaw the route had a concurrency with then-European route E12; unknown precise date of change in the national numbering^{A}; from 1974, the Tarnowo Podgórne – Poznań – Września stretch is a dual carriageway road
17	E8	Pniewy – Poznań – Września – Słupca – Konin – Koło – Krośniewice – Kutno – Łowicz – Sochaczew – Błonie – Warsaw	national: 1952–14 II 1986; European: 1962–1985	Mapa samochodowa Polski 1:1 000 000 (in Polish), Warsaw: Państwowe Przedsiębiorstwo Wydawnictw Kartograficznych, 1962; Samochodowy atlas Polski 1:500 000 (in Polish), vol. 9, Warsaw: Państwowe Przedsiębiorstwo Wydawnictw Kartograficznych, 1984; Reiseatlas DDR mit ČSSR, Polen, UDSSR, Ungarn, Rumänien, Bulgarien, Berlin/Leipzig, DDR: VEB Tourist Verlag, 1977, p. 37	between Łowicz and Warsaw the route had a concurrency with then-European route E12; unknown precise date of change in the national numbering^{A}; from 1974, the Tarnowo Podgórne – Poznań – Września stretch is a dual carriageway road
13	E8	Warsaw – Mińsk Mazowiecki – Siedlce – Międzyrzec Podlaski – Biała Podlaska – Terespol – state border	national: 1952–14 II 1986; European: 1962–1985	Mapa samochodowa Polski 1:1 000 000 (in Polish), Warsaw: Państwowe Przedsiębiorstwo Wydawnictw Kartograficznych, 1962; Samochodowy atlas Polski 1:500 000 (in Polish), vol. 9, Warsaw: Państwowe Przedsiębiorstwo Wydawnictw Kartograficznych, 1984; Reiseatlas DDR mit ČSSR, Polen, UDSSR, Ungarn, Rumänien, Bulgarien, Berlin/Leipzig, DDR: VEB Tourist Verlag, 1977, p. 37	between Łowicz and Warsaw the route had a concurrency with then-European route E12; unknown precise date of change in the national numbering^{A}; from 1974, the Tarnowo Podgórne – Poznań – Września stretch is a dual carriageway road
2	E30	state border – Świecko – Świebodzin – Pniewy – Poznań – Września – Słupca – Konin – Koło – Krośniewice – Kutno – Łowicz – Sochaczew – Błonie – Warsaw – Mińsk Mazowiecki – Siedlce – Międzyrzec Podlaski – Biała Podlaska – Terespol – state border	national: from 14 II 1986, with later amends; international: from 1985	Uchwała nr 192 Rady Ministrów z dnia 2 grudnia 1985 r. w sprawie zaliczenia dróg do kategorii dróg krajowych [Resolution No. 192 of the Council of Ministers of December 2, 1985 on including roads in the category of national roads], M.P., 1986, vol. 3, No. 16 (1985-12-02)	with opening subsequent sections of motorway A2 the old route is renumbered as the national road 92

== Major cities and towns along the route ==
- Świecko (road 29) – border with Germany
- Rzepin (road 92) – motorway bypass
- Poznań (road 5, 11) – motorway bypass
- Września (road 15, 92) – motorway bypass
- Konin (Modła) (road 25, 72) – motorway bypass
- Skierniewice (road 70)
- Łowicz (road 14, 70, 92)
- Pruszków – motorway bypass
- Warsaw (road 7, 8, 61, 79, 17) – expressway bypass
- Mińsk Mazowiecki (road 50) – motorway bypass
- Kałuszyn
- Siedlce (road 63) – bypass
- Międzyrzec Podlaski (road 19) – bypass
- Biała Podlaska – bypass
- Wólka Dobryńska (road 68)
- Terespol – bypass, border with Belarus

== Details of the course of the route ==
=== Warsaw ===
Over the years, the course of national road 2 through Warsaw was changed several times:

- February 14, 1986^{B}–2000: Połczyńska Street – Wolska Street – Marcina Kasprzaka Street – Prosta Street – Ignacego Daszyńskiego Roundabout – Towarowa Street – Artura Zawiszy Square – Raszyńska Street^{C} / Andrzeja Kryckiego Street^{D} – Wawelska Street^{E} – Armii Ludowej Avenue^{E} – Łazienkowski Bridge^{E}^{F} – Stanów Zjednoczonych Avenue^{E} – Ostrobramska Street^{G} – Płowiecka Street – Bronisława Czecha Street
- 2000–2014: Połczyńska Street – Wolska Street – Marcina Kasprzaka Street – Prymasa Tysiąclecia Avenue – Jerozolimskie Avenue – Mieczysława Grzymały-Sokołowskiego Street – Kopińska Street – Wawelska Street – Armii Ludowej Avenue – Łazienkowski Bridge – Stanów Zjednoczonych Avenue – Ostrobramska Street – Płowiecka Street – Bronisława Czecha Street – Trakt Brzeski Street^{H}
- 2014–December 22, 2020: Polskiej Organizacji Wojskowej Avenue^{I} – Legionów Piłsudskiego Avenue^{I} – Puławska Street – Dolina Służewiecka Street – Generała Władysława Sikorskiego Avenue – Wincentego Witosa Avenue – Józefa Becka Avenue^{J} – Siekierkowski Bridge^{J} – Generała Bolesława Wieniawy-Długoszewskiego Avenue^{J} – Płowiecka Street – Bronisława Czecha Street – Trakt Brzeski Street
- December 22, 2020–December 20, 2021: as above and the southern bypass between Warsaw Wilanów junction and Lubelska interchange
- from December 20, 2021: entire route of southern bypass

=== Near Mińsk Mazowiecki ===
Between the crossing with national road 17 in Warsaw and the junction with national road 50 in Stojadła the national road 2 was completely a priority road (19.4 kilometres (12.1 mi)). In 2011 alterations were made on this section – the traffic signals were installed and in Dębe Wielkie a roundabout has been built.

In August 2012 a motorway bypass of Mińsk Mazowiecki has been opened and the course of road 2 was assigned to that route. On December 17, 2012, by the ordinance of General Director of National Roads and Highways, the old route Choszczówka Stojecka – Mińsk Mazowiecki – Ryczołek (Kałuszyn) was renumbered as the national road 92. In March 2021, by the ordinance of General Director of National Roads and Highways, the section between crossing with national road 17 on the border of Warsaw and Zakręt and Choszczówka Stojecka was renumbered as the national road 92. From east of Mińsk Mazowiecki up to Siedlce (including bypass of the city), the road 2 is completely a priority road (over 50 kilometres (31 mi)).

== Kilometrage ==
The table below contains information about the kilometrage of the route. It is based on the data published by General Directorate for National Roads and Highways. It may contain not entirely precise data.

Kilometrage of national road 2^{K}
Road number	Section	Starting km	Ending km	Notes
2b	border bridge in Świecko – Świecko junction	0.0	2.8	local kilometrage; the mid-point of junction is at 2.8 kilometres (1.7 mi)
A2	Świecko junction – Poznań – Konin – Stryków – Konotopa interchange	2.8	455.6	according to the road signs the motorway starts at 3.9 kilometres (2.4 mi); concurrency: with S5 (E261): ≈154.7 km – 180 km; with S11: ≈154.7 km – 170.6 km; between Pruszków junction and Konotopa interchange the carriageway towards Warsaw is signed as an expressway; ending kilometrage is at mid-point of the junctions
S2	Warsaw southern bypass: Konotopa interchange – Puławska junction – Lubelska interchange	455.6	489.7	starting and ending kilometrages are at mid-points of specific junctions; concurrency: with S8 (E67): 455.6 km – 461.4 km; with S79: 468.2 km – 470.2 km
A2	Lubelska interchange – Mińsk Mazowiecki – Kałuszyn	489.7	525.2	ending kilometrage is at mid-point of Kałuszyn junction
2	Kałuszyn – Siedlce – Biała Podlaska – Terespol – state border	532.4	≈673.1	starting kilometrage is underneath the viaduct of motorway A2 near the junction; reissue of kilometrage of the former route; ending kilometrage is before the border bridge over Bug river; according to the referenced material it is the last milestone
2d	Warsaw: Puławska junction – Siekierkowska Thoroughfare – Bronisława Czecha Street	0.0	17.1	the section is not a national road from December 2021; local kilometrage; partially overlaps with a new route of voivodeship road 628

== See also ==
- Motorway A2
- Expressway S2
- National road 92
- European route E30

== Notes ==
^A In the 1970s there was another renumbering of roads in Poland. Some of them were signed as T-roads (e.g. T8) and it was valid until 1986.
^B In February 1986 the regulation from December 2, 1985 came into force.
^C Between Filtrowa Street and Wawelska Street is signed as one-way road.
^D Only towards west.
^E Part of Łazienkowska Thoroughfare.
^F From 1981 to 1998 the bridge was named as Generał Zygmunt Berling Bridge.
^G In the road atlas of Warsaw from 1996 Ostrobramska Street was described as part of Łazienkowska Thoroughfare.
^H Until 2003 the road was outside of Warsaw.
^I Part of Expressway S2.
^J Part of Siekierkowska Thoroughfare.
^K As of March 28, 2023.
