= Czecha Street, Warsaw =

Street in Warsaw, Poland

Bronisława Czecha Street
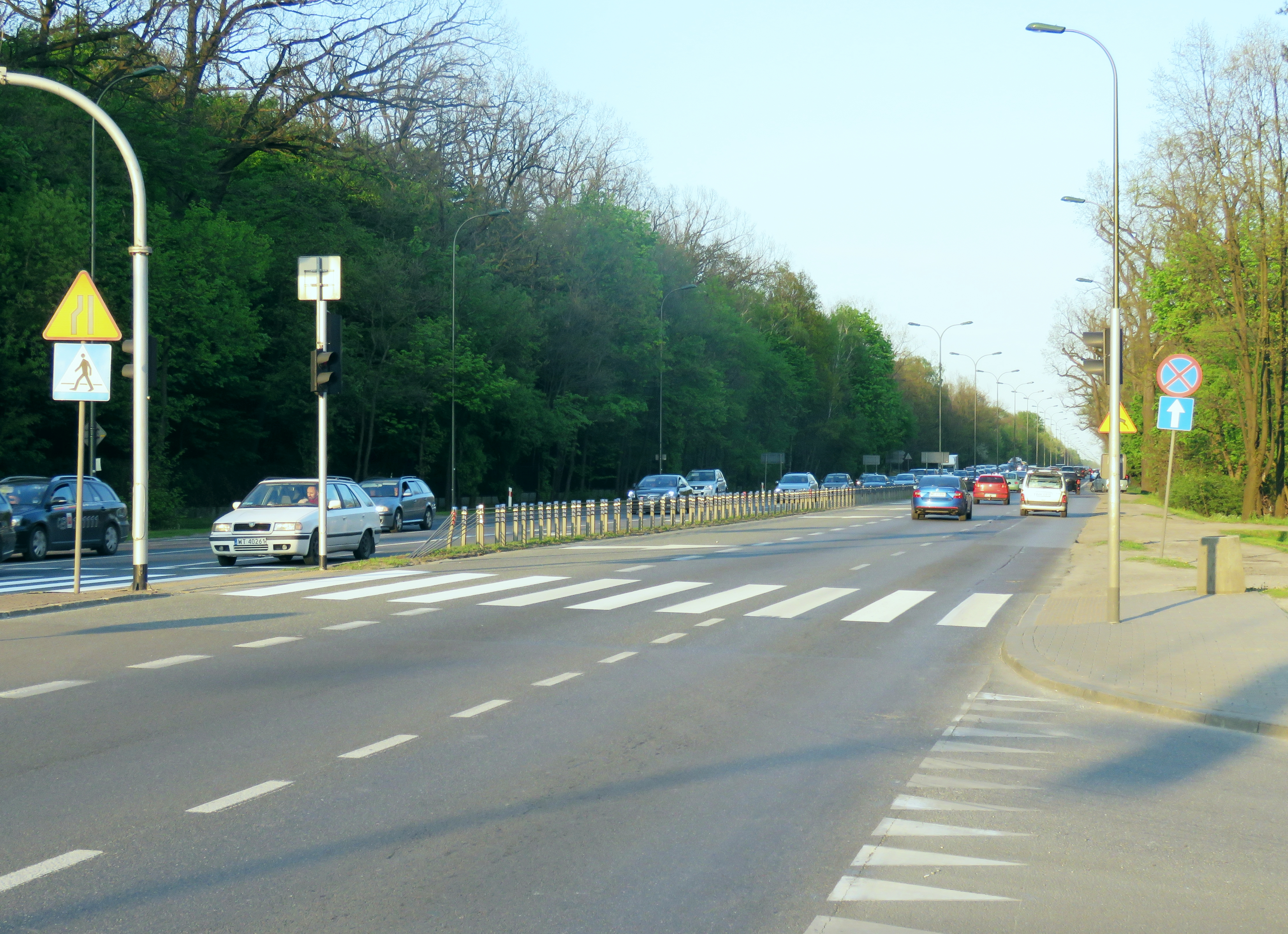
- Bronisława Czecha Street in 2017
- Interactive map of Bronisława Czecha Street
- Native name: Ulica Bronisława Czecha (Polish)
- Maintained by: ZDM Warsaw
- Length: 4.10 km (2.55 mi)
- Location: Warsaw, Poland
- Coordinates: 52.2255°N 21.17408°E
- West end: Płowiecka
- East end: Trakt Brzeski

Other
- Website: zdm.waw.pl

Bronisława Czecha Street (Polish: Ulica Bronisława Czecha) is located in Warsaw, Poland. Its dual carriageway, starts in the district of Wawer continuing from Płowiecka street on a viaduct over PKP rail line 7 north of Warszawa Wawer railway station, runs east mostly through the forest of the Masovian Landscape Park to the border between Wawer and Wesoła were from an intersection with a residential street called Wawerska the main road continues as Trakt Brzeski. Its path forms the boundary between the neighborhoods of Marysin Wawerski to the north and Anin to the south.

It is the main road exiting Warsaw towards the east, and one of three roads connecting Wesoła with the rest of Warsaw together with Korkowa Street and Cyrulików Street.

Together with Grochowska, Płowiecka and Trakt Breszki the street forms part of the 19th century Brześć Chaussee (Polish: Szosa Brzeska), a 200 kilometer road from the Grochów toll house at the Lubomirski Ramparts in Praga to Brześć Litewski (today Bieraście, Belarus), laid out and paved along a historic tract by Fr. Stanisław Staszic by 1823.

Prior to the opening of the S2 expressway, which serves as the southern bypass of Warsaw, the street belonged to the national road network as part of DK 2 and to European route E30. Upon its rerouting on December 20, 2021, the old course was downgraded to a Voivodeship road marked as DW 628.

The patron of the street is Bronisław Czech, a Polish skier and Olympian.
