= Gmina Słubice =

Gmina Słubice may refer to either of the following administrative districts in Poland:

- Gmina Słubice, Masovian Voivodeship
- Gmina Słubice, Lubusz Voivodeship
