= Łazy Lubuskie =

- Village
- Location within Poland
- Coordinates: 51°41′49″N 14°51′18″E
- Country: Poland
- Voivodeship: Lubusz
- County: Słubice
- Gmina: Słubice
- Population: 45

Łazy Lubuskie [ˈwazɨ luˈbuskʲɛ] is a village in the administrative district of Gmina Słubice, within Słubice County, Lubusz Voivodeship, in western Poland, close to the German border.
