= Nowe Biskupice, Lubusz Voivodeship =

Nowe Biskupice
- Village
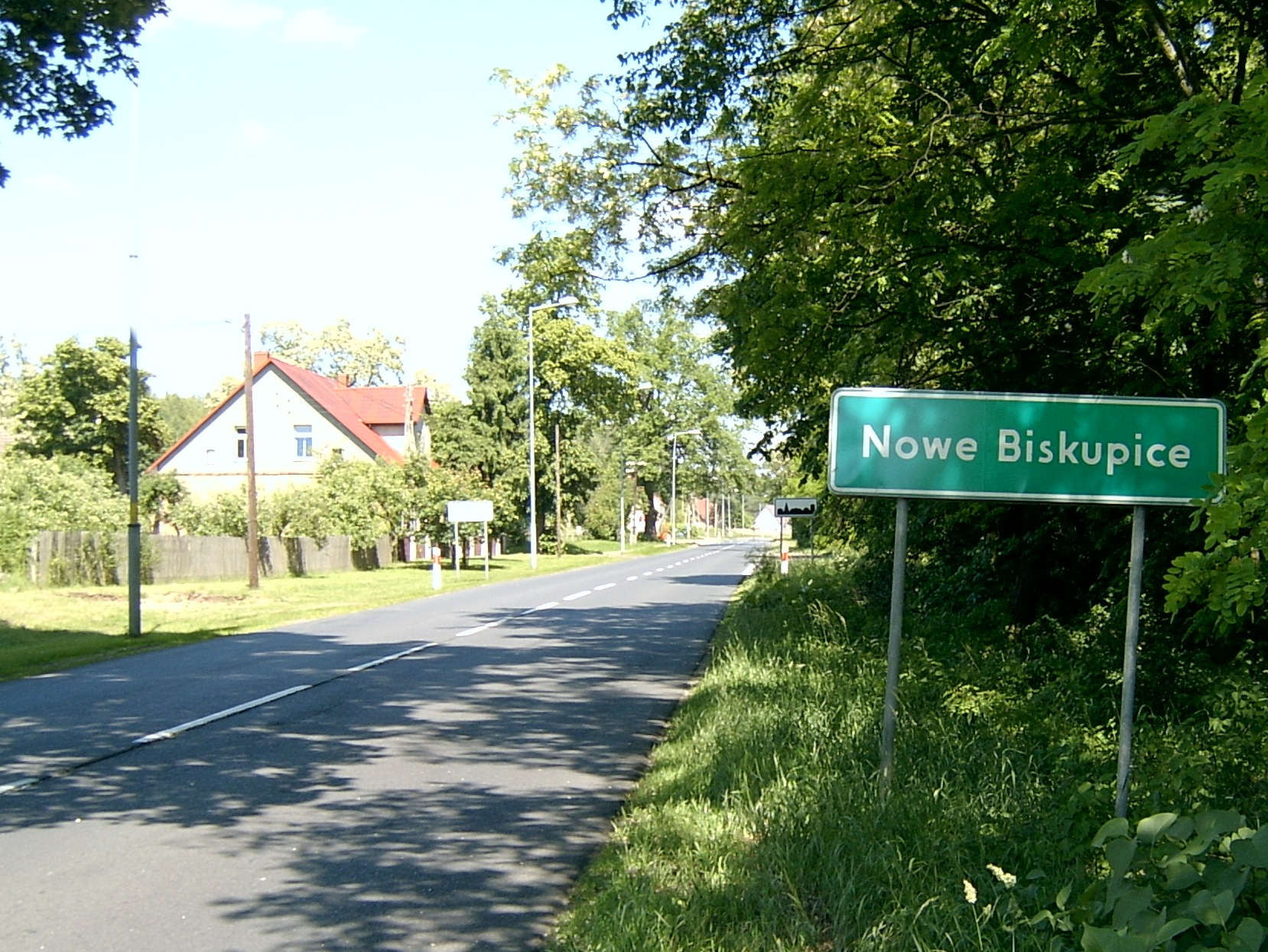
- View of the village in June 2006

- Location within Poland
- Coordinates: 52°22′N 14°41′E
- Country: Poland
- Voivodeship: Lubusz
- County: Słubice
- Gmina: Słubice
- Population: 120

Nowe Biskupice ([ˈnɔvɛ bʲiskuˈpʲit͡sɛ]) is a village in the administrative district of Gmina Słubice, within Słubice County, Lubusz Voivodeship, in western Poland, close to the German border.
