= Pławidło =

- Village
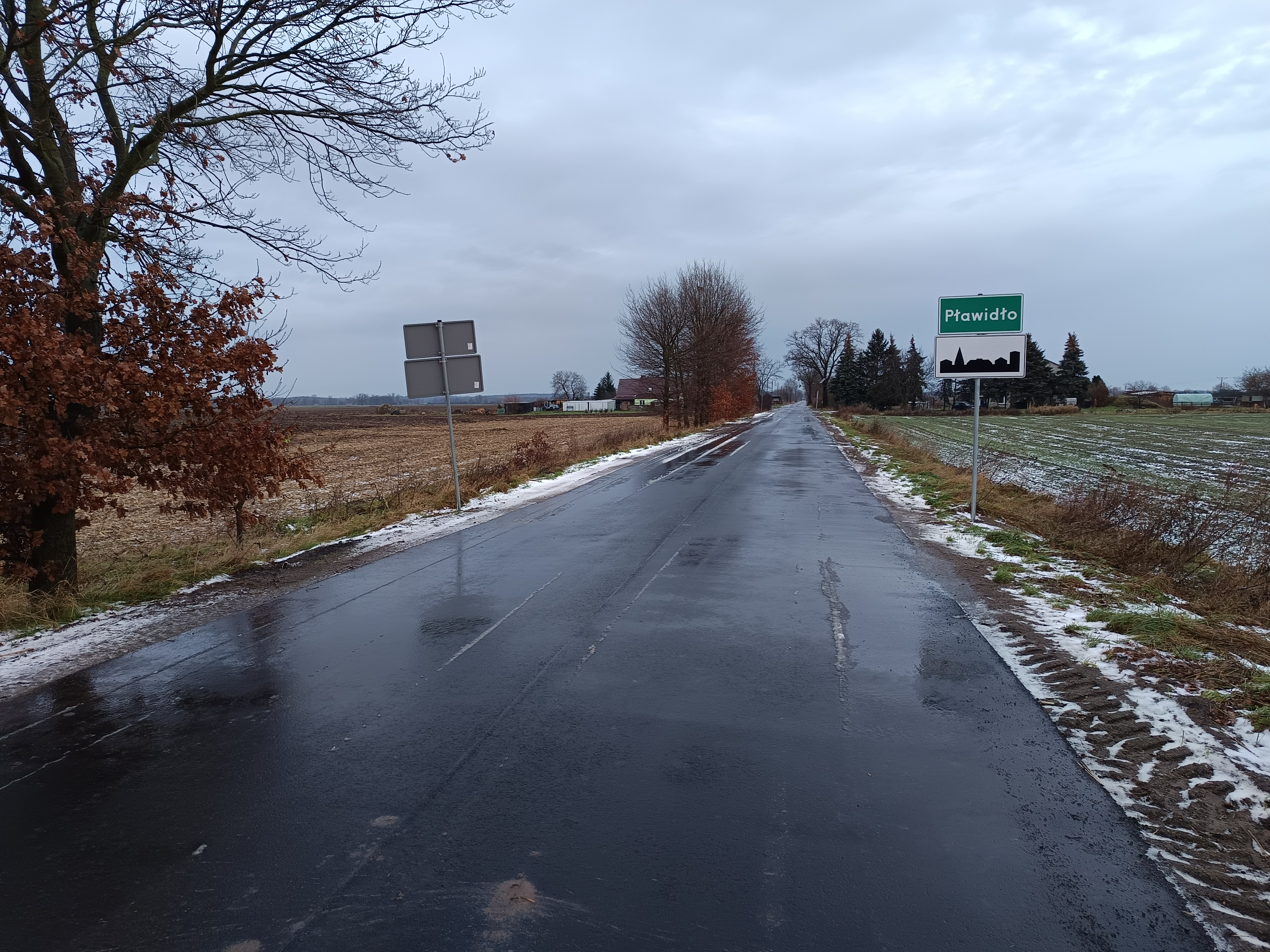

- Location within Poland
- Coordinates: 52°25′N 14°36′E
- Country: Poland
- Voivodeship: Lubusz
- County: Słubice
- Gmina: Słubice
- Population: 190

Pławidło [pwaˈvʲidwɔ] is a village in the administrative district of Gmina Słubice, within Słubice County, Lubusz Voivodeship, in western Poland, close to the German border.
