= Nowy Lubusz =

- Village
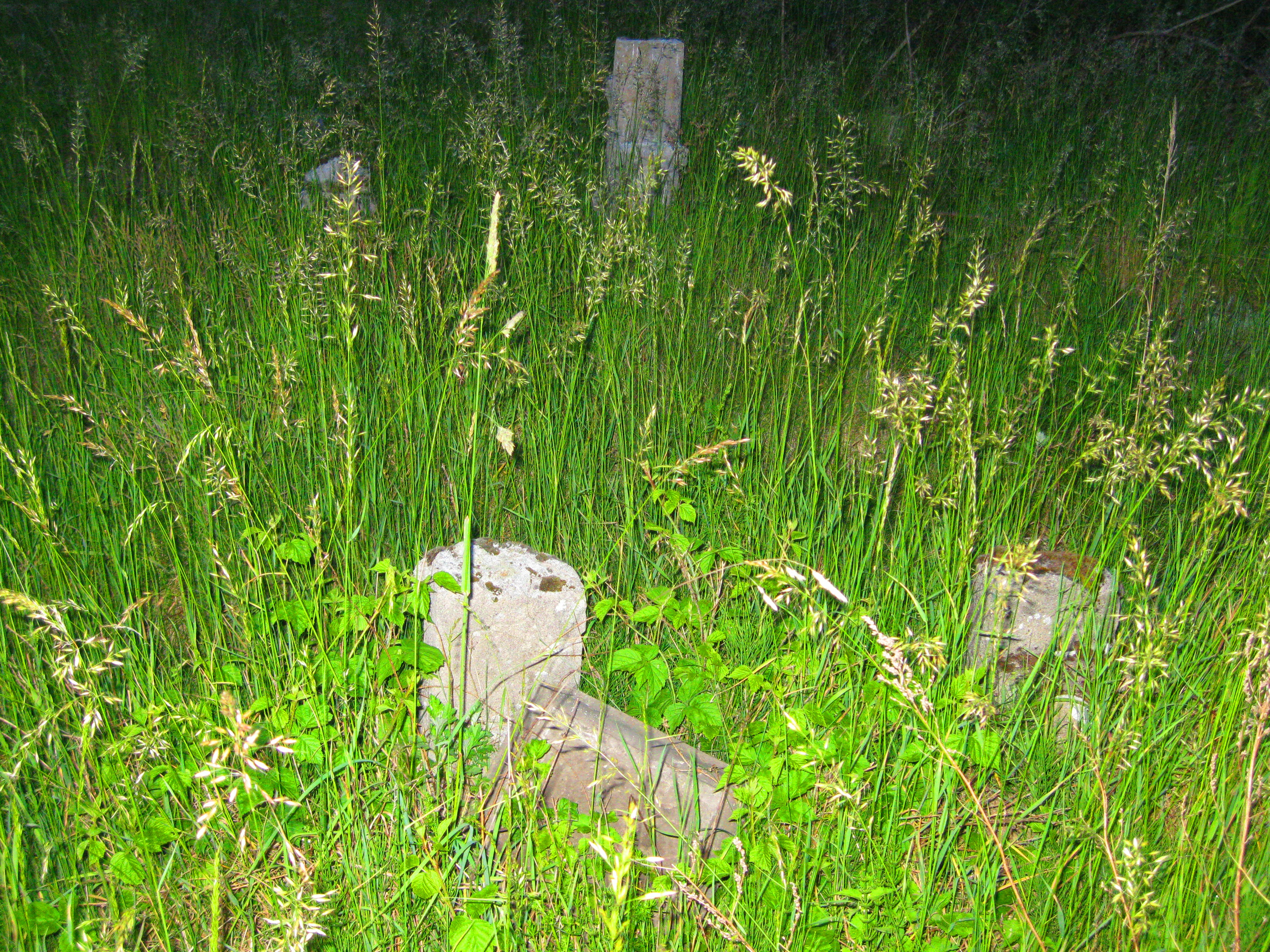
- Remains of the German cemetery in Nowy Lubusz

- Location within Poland
- Coordinates: 52°24′16″N 14°32′59″E
- Country: Poland
- Voivodeship: Lubusz
- County: Słubice
- Gmina: Słubice
- Population: 160

Nowy Lubusz [ˈnɔvɨ ˈlubuʂ] is a village in the administrative district of Gmina Słubice, within Słubice County, Lubusz Voivodeship, in western Poland, close to the German border.
