= Lisów, Lubusz Voivodeship =

Lisów
- Village
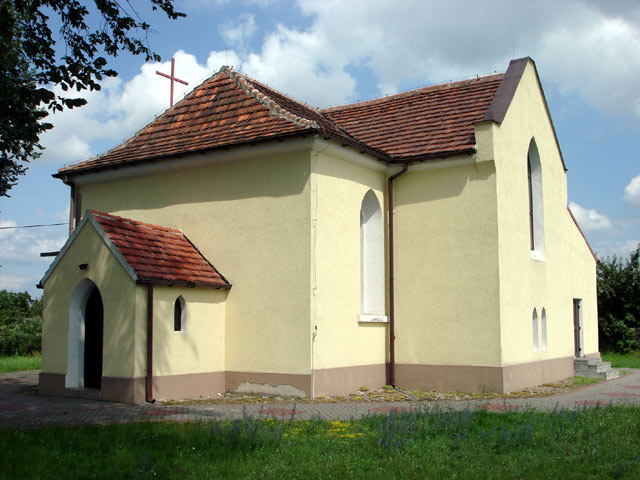
- Catholic church

- Location within Poland
- Coordinates: 52°25′N 14°39′E
- Country: Poland
- Voivodeship: Lubusz
- County: Słubice
- Gmina: Słubice
- Population: 140

Lisów [ˈlʲisuf] is a village in the administrative district of Gmina Słubice, within Słubice County, Lubusz Voivodeship, in western Poland, close to the German border.
