= Golice, Lubusz Voivodeship =

Golice
- Village
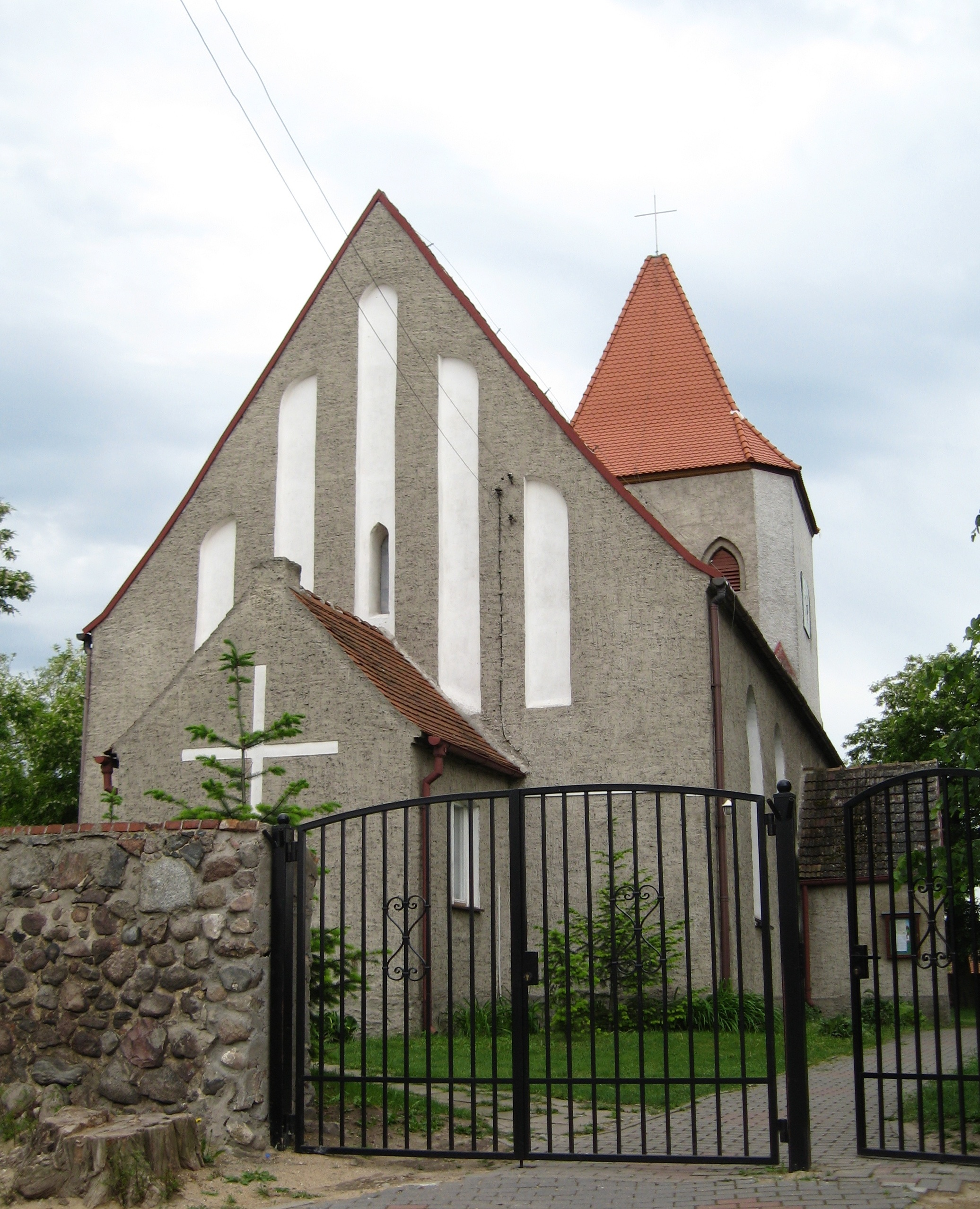

- Location within Poland
- Coordinates: 52°26′N 14°40′E
- Country: Poland
- Voivodeship: Lubusz
- County: Słubice
- Gmina: Słubice
- Population: 370

Golice [ɡɔˈlʲit͡sɛ] is a village in the administrative district of Gmina Słubice, within Słubice County, Lubusz Voivodeship, in western Poland, close to the German border.
