= Stare Biskupice, Lubusz Voivodeship =

Stare Biskupice
- Village
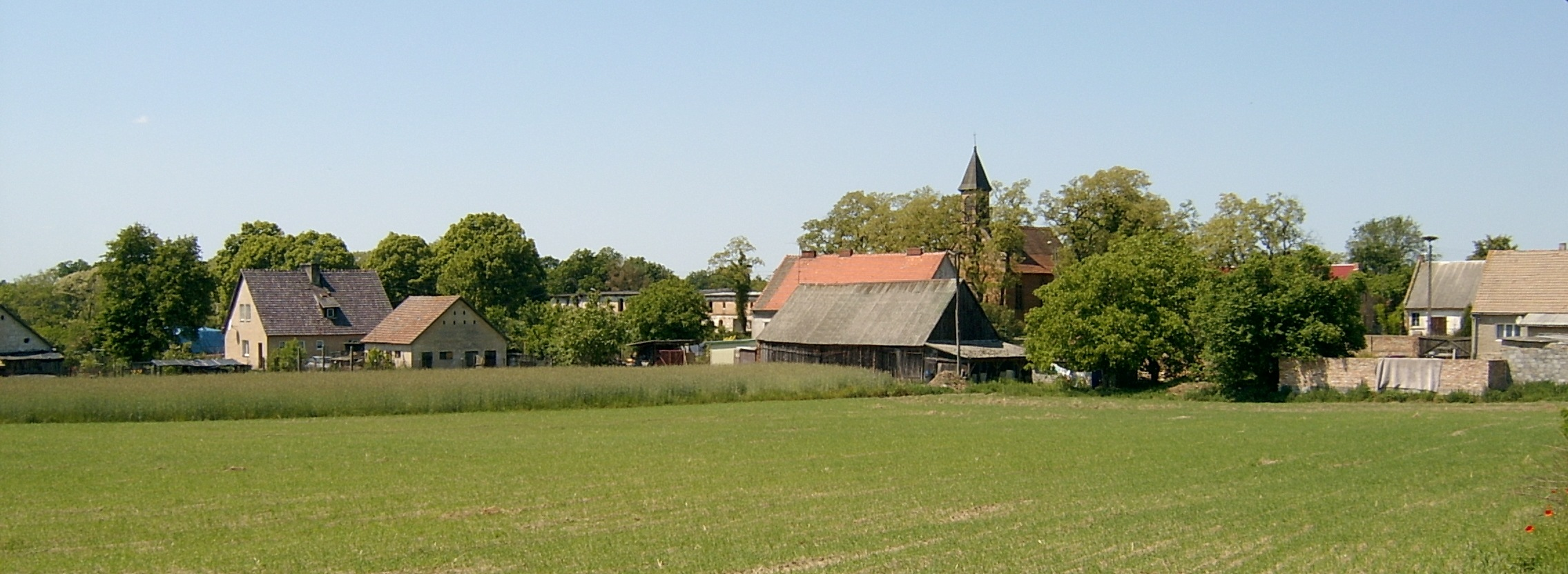
- Panorama of the village

- Location within Poland
- Coordinates: 52°23′N 14°40′E
- Country: Poland
- Voivodeship: Lubusz
- County: Słubice
- Gmina: Słubice

Population
  - Total: 100

Stare Biskupice ([starɛ bʲiskupʲit͡sɛ]) is a village in the administrative district of Gmina Słubice, within Słubice County, Lubusz Voivodeship, in western Poland, close to the German border.
