= Modła, Konin County =

Modła
- Village
- Location within Poland
- Coordinates: 52°10′N 18°4′E
- Country: Poland
- Voivodeship: Greater Poland
- County: Konin
- Gmina: Rzgów

Modła [ˈmɔdwa] is a village in the administrative district of Gmina Rzgów, within Konin County, Greater Poland Voivodeship, in west-central Poland.
