= Kunice, Słubice County =

Kunice
- Village
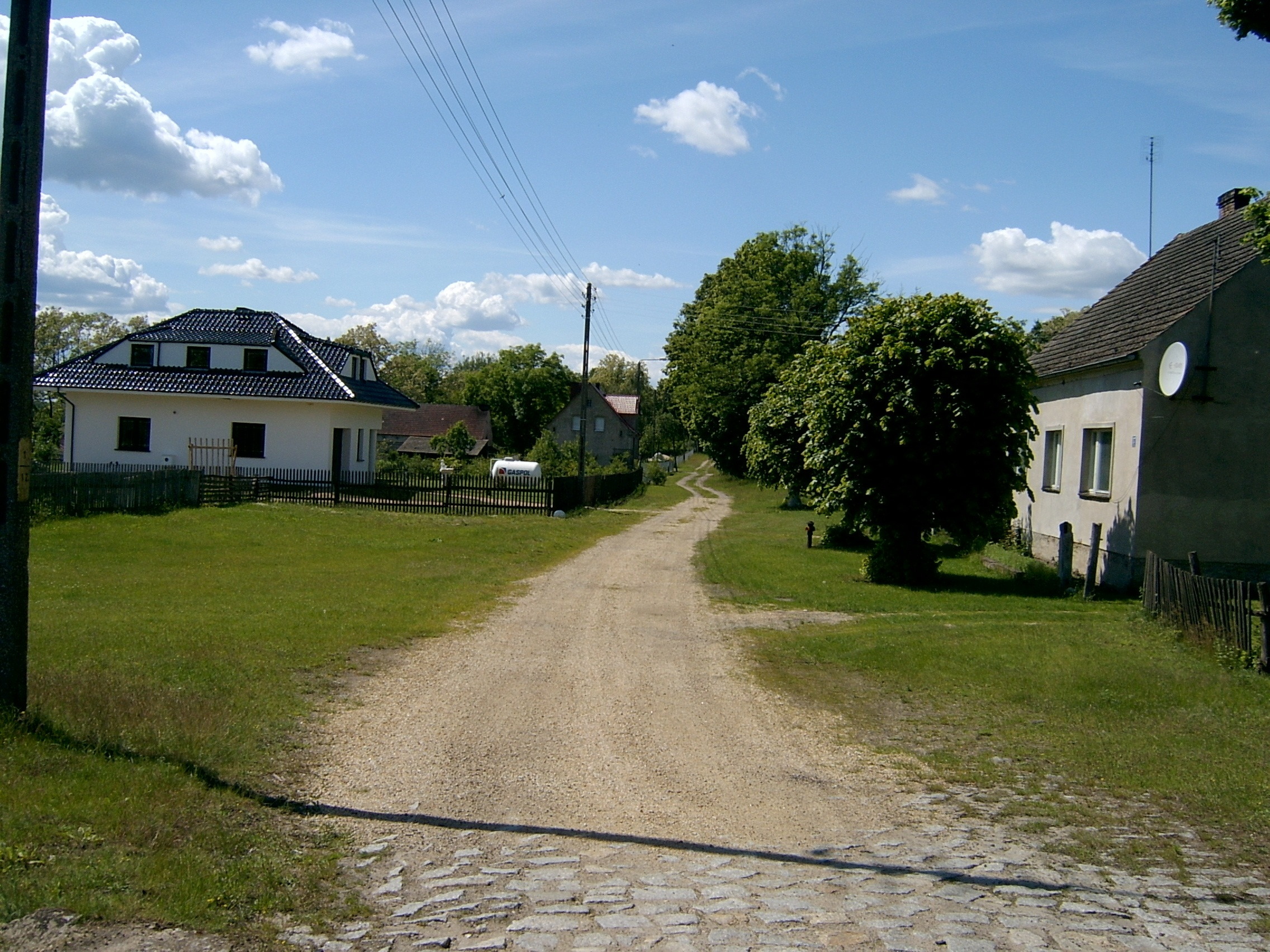

- Location within Poland
- Coordinates: 52°16′0″N 14°39′10″E
- Country: Poland
- Voivodeship: Lubusz
- County: Słubice
- Gmina: Słubice
- Population: 80

Kunice [kuˈɲit͡sɛ] is a village in the administrative district of Gmina Słubice, within Słubice County, Lubusz Voivodeship, in western Poland, close to the German border.
