= Rybocice =

- Village
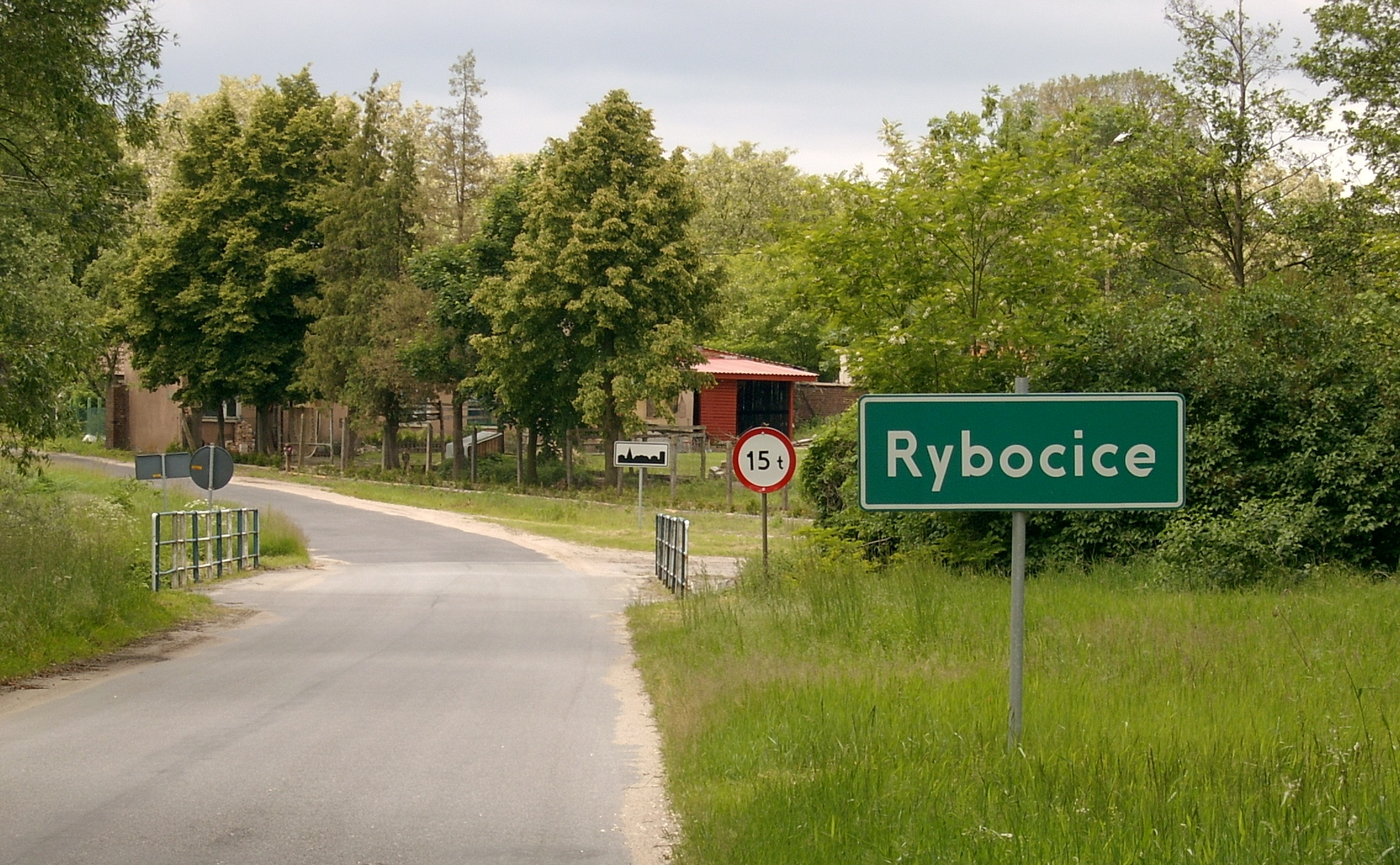
- Rybocice in June 2006

- Location within Poland
- Coordinates: 52°17′N 14°38′E
- Country: Poland
- Voivodeship: Lubusz
- County: Słubice
- Gmina: Słubice
- Population: 210

Rybocice [rɨbɔˈt͡ɕit͡sɛ] is a village in the administrative district of Gmina Słubice, within Słubice County, Lubusz Voivodeship, in western Poland, close to the German border.
