= Drzecin =

- Village
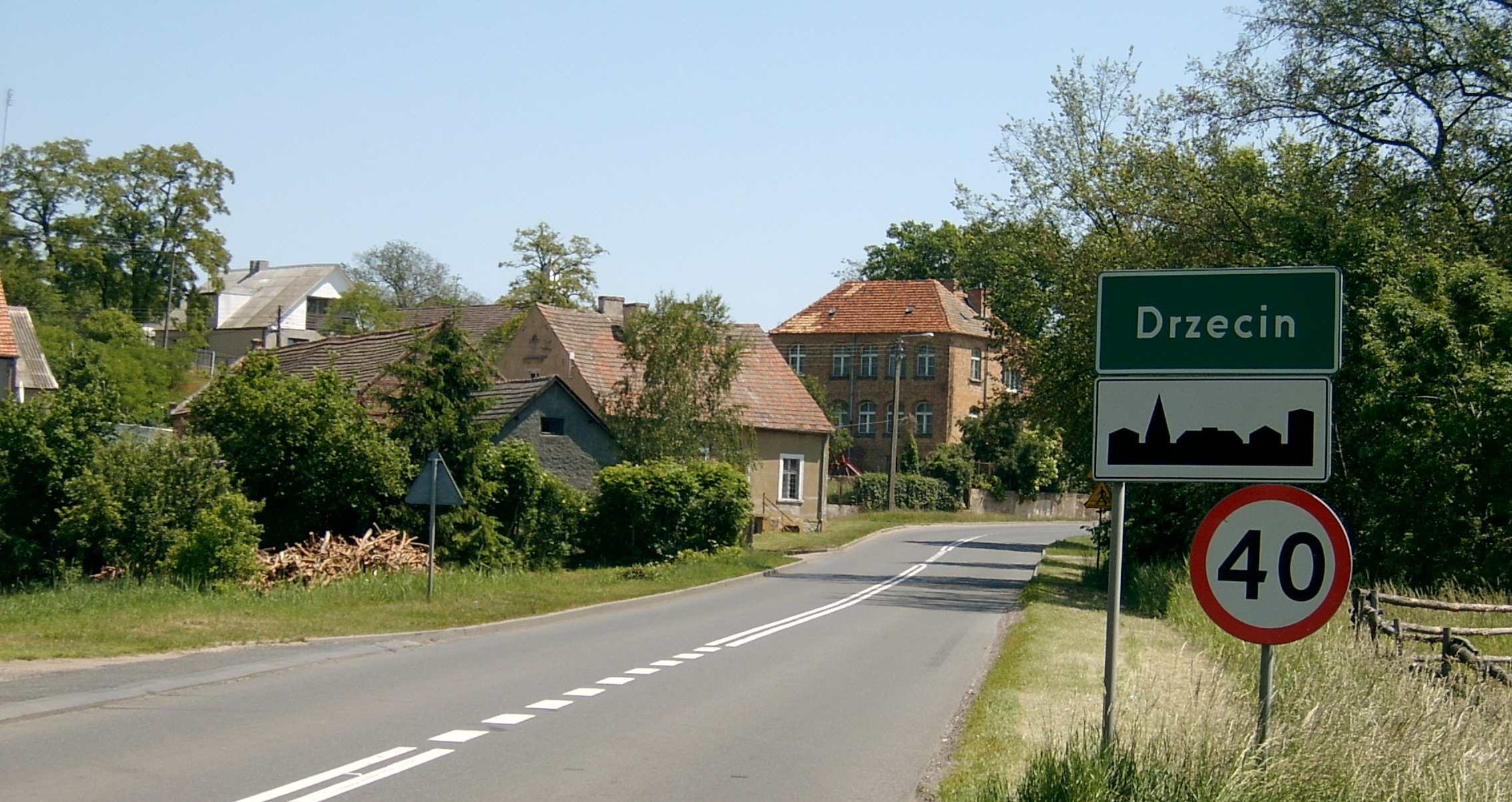
- Entering Drzecin

- Location within Poland
- Coordinates: 52°23′N 14°38′E
- Country: Poland
- Voivodeship: Lubusz
- County: Słubice
- Gmina: Słubice

Population
  - Total: 400

Drzecin [ˈdʐɛt͡ɕin] is a Polish village in the administrative district of Gmina Słubice, within Słubice County, Lubusz Voivodeship, in western Poland, close to the German border.
