= Kunowice =

- Village
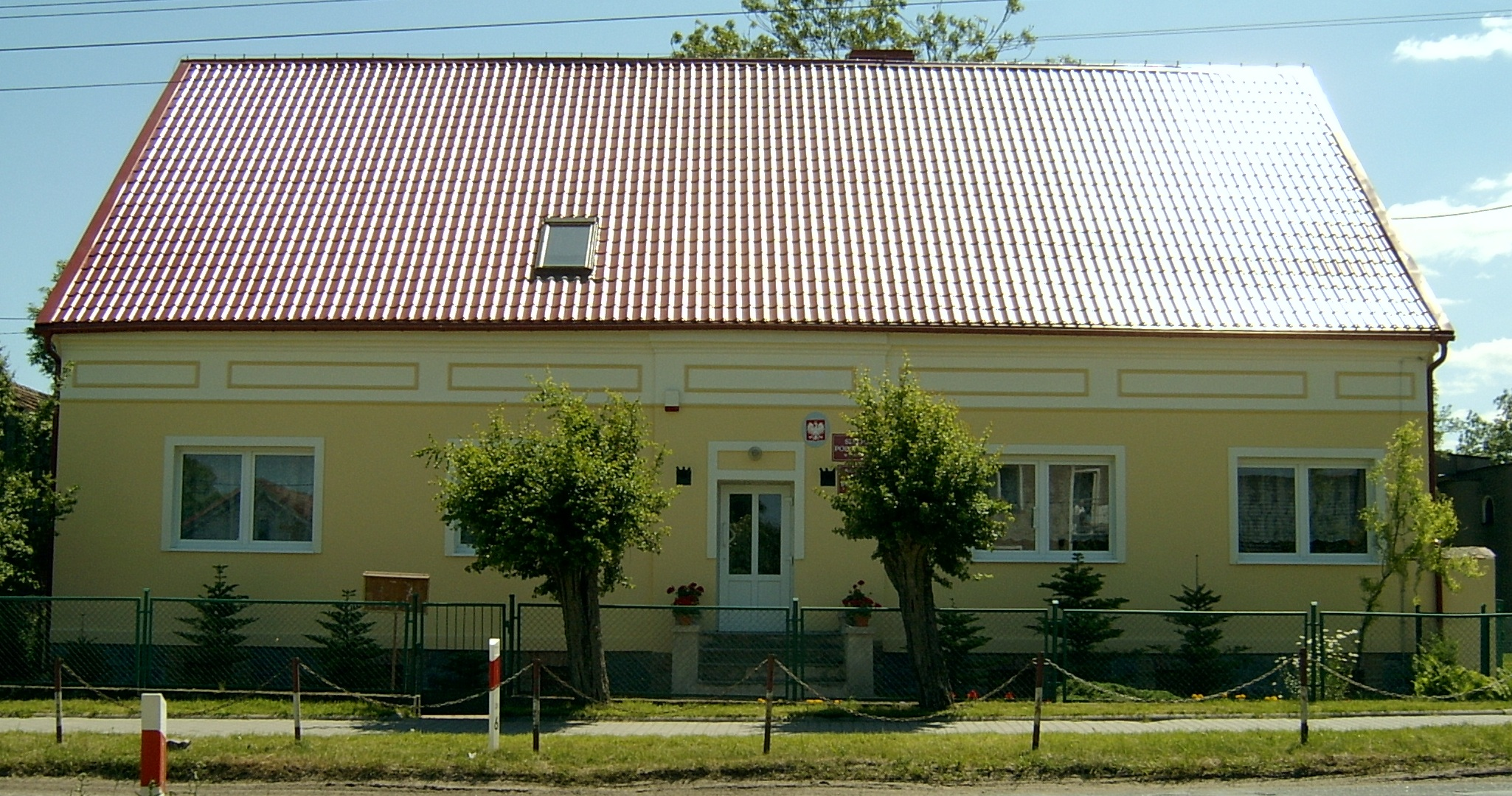
- Primary school in Kunowice

- Location within Poland
- Coordinates: 52°21′N 14°38′E
- Country: Poland
- Voivodeship: Lubusz
- County: Słubice
- Gmina: Słubice

Population
  - Total: 1,455 in the 2,021 census.
- Time zone: UTC+1 (CET)
  - Summer (DST): UTC+2 (CEST)
- Vehicle registration: FSL

Kunowice ([kunɔˈvʲit͡sɛ]) is a village in the administrative district of Gmina Słubice, within Słubice County, Lubusz Voivodeship, in western Poland, near the Oder river and the German border.

== History ==
The village is located in the historic Lubusz Land, which formed part of Poland since the establishment of the state by the Piast dynasty in the 10th century. In the 13th century, it passed to the Margraviate of Brandenburg. In 1319, it passed to the Duchy of Pomerania, and then back to Brandenburg several years later. Kunersdorf was first documented in 1337 as part of the Neumark region (Terra trans Oderam). Between 1373 and 1415 it was part of the Bohemian (Czech) Crown. Elector Jobst of Luxembourg sold it to the City of Frankfurt in 1399. It was devastated by the troops of Duke Jan II the Mad of Żagań on his 1477 expedition against the Brandenburg elector Albert Achilles of Hohenzollern and again by Imperial as well as Swedish forces during the Thirty Years' War.

During the Seven Years' War, the village was occupied by Russian forces after the Prussian defeat at the 1759 Battle of Kay. On 12 August 1759 at the Battle of Kunersdorf, the Prussian Army of King Frederick II was destroyed by the united Russian and Austrian forces under Count Pyotr Saltykov.

In 1815 after the Napoleonic Wars Kunerdorf belonged to the newly created Prussian Province of Brandenburg. With Prussia it became part of the German Empire in 1871 during the unification of Germany, and from 1873 on was administered within the Weststernberg district with its capital at Drossen (Ośno Lubuskie). During World War II, in January 1945, a German-perpetrated death march of prisoners of various nationalities from the dissolved camp in Żabikowo to the Sachsenhausen concentration camp passed through the village. The village was conquered by the Red Army during the Vistula–Oder Offensive in February 1945. Since the implementation of the Oder-Neisse line by the 1945 Potsdam Agreement, the eastern portion of the Lubusz Land with Kunowice has been again of Poland.

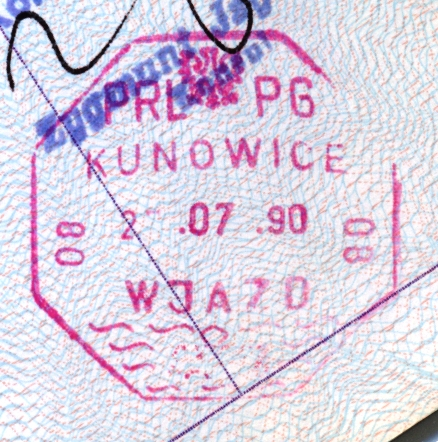
Polish passport stamp, 1990

== Transportation ==
After 1945, Kunowice station was the site of a railroad border crossing on the line from Poznań to Frankfurt, until in 2003 a new station was opened at the border town of Słubice.

Kunowice's railway station appeared in the 2003 German film Distant Lights (Lichter).
