= Korkowa Street, Warsaw =

Street in Warsaw, Poland

Korkowa Street
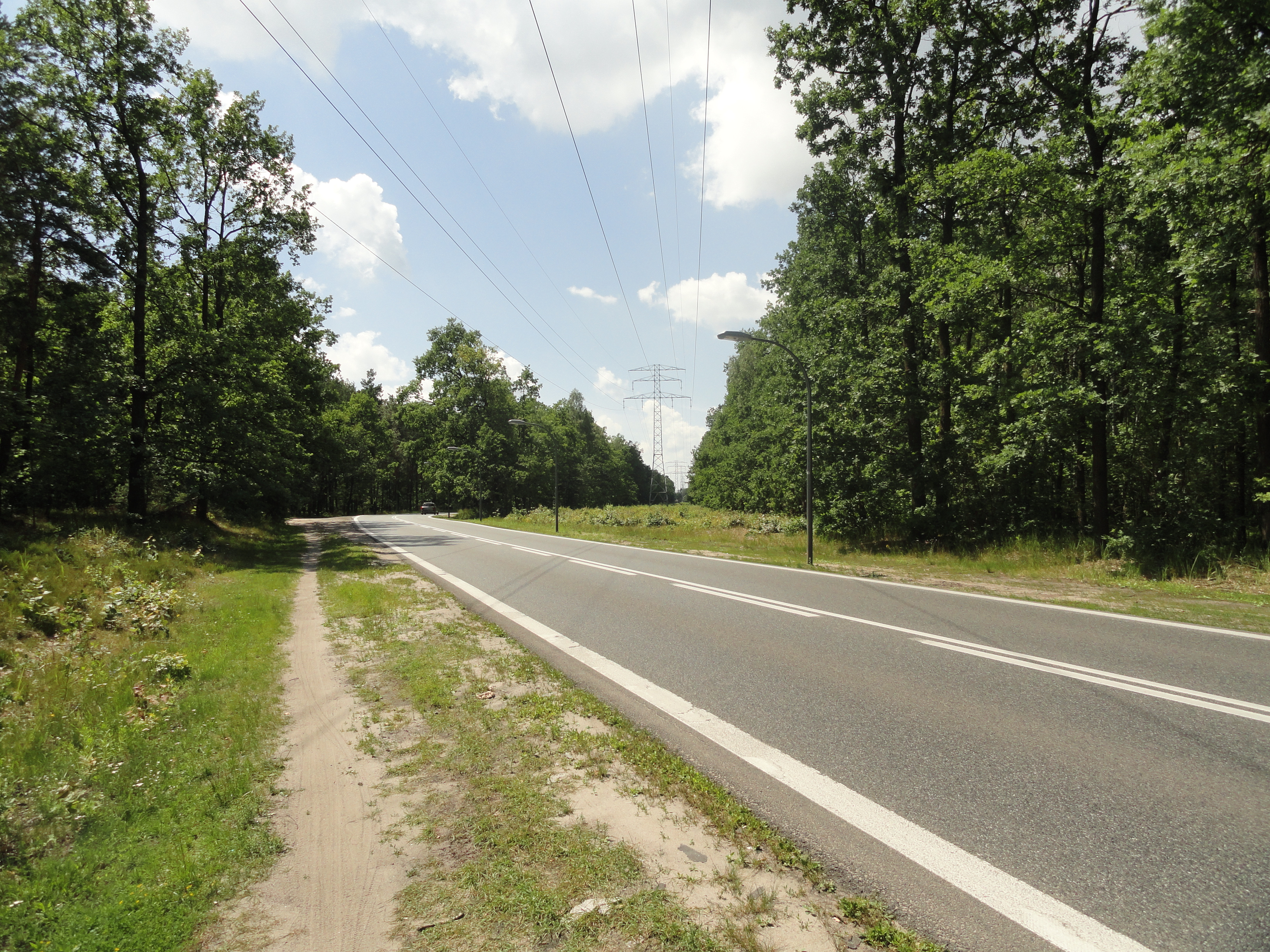
- Part of the street near forest
- Interactive map of Korkowa Street
- Native name: Ulica Korkowa (Polish)
- Maintained by: ZDM Warsaw
- Length: 2.18 mi (3.51 km)
- Location: Wawer, Warsaw, Poland
- Coordinates: 52.239194°N 21.152694°E
- West end: Płowiecka
- East end: Jagiellońska / Wspólna / Płatnerska

Other
- Website: zdm.waw.pl

Korkowa Street is a major road located in the Wawer district of Warsaw, Poland.

== Description ==
Korkowa Street is the axis of Marysin Wawerski, dividing it into the northern and southern part. Starting from the intersection with Płowiecka Street to the east of the Ignacy Mościcki Roundabout, it ends on the border with the Wesoła district. It also borders with many green areas, including Rembertów Forest and King Jan Sobieski Reserve. Close to the street there's Church of St. Felix from Cantalice, and from its tower Adolf Hitler observed occupation of Warsaw on September 15, 1939.

Korkowa Street is two-way and unambiguous along the entire length, with a turn-off bands separated in several places. There are no bicycle paths along it. There are many public transport lines running, including 115, 173, 402, 520 and the night lines N02, N25, N71.
