= Gmina Słubice, Lubusz Voivodeship =

Gmina Słubice Słubice Commune
- Gmina
- Flag Coat of arms
- Interactive map of Gmina Słubice
- Coordinates (Słubice): 52°21′N 14°34′E
- Country: Poland
- Voivodeship: Lubusz
- County: Słubice
- Seat: Słubice

Area
  - Total: 185.42 km^{2} (71.59 sq mi)

Population (2019-06-30)
  - Total: 20,061
  - Density: 108.19/km^{2} (280.22/sq mi)
  - Urban: 16,705
  - Rural: 3,356
- Website: http://www.slubice.pl

Gmina Słubice is an urban-rural gmina (administrative district) in Słubice County, Lubusz Voivodeship, in western Poland, on the German border. Its seat is the town of Słubice, which lies approximately 63 kilometres (39 mi) south-west of Gorzów Wielkopolski and 79 km (49 mi) north-west of Zielona Góra.

The gmina covers an area of 185.42 square kilometres (71.6 sq mi), and as of 2019 its total population is 20,061.

== Villages ==
Apart from the town of Słubice, Gmina Słubice contains the villages and settlements of Drzecin, Golice, Kunice, Kunowice, Łazy Lubuskie, Lisów, Nowe Biskupice, Nowy Lubusz, Pławidło, Rybocice, Stare Biskupice and Świecko.

== Neighbouring gminas ==
Gmina Słubice is bordered by the gminas of Cybinka, Górzyca and Rzepin. It also borders Germany.

== Twin towns – sister cities ==
Gmina Słubice is twinned with:

- Elektrėnai, Lithuania (2010)
- Frankfurt (Oder), Germany (1975)
- Heilbronn, Germany (1998)
- Shostka, Ukraine (2008)
- Tijuana, Mexico (1998)
- Yuma, United States (2000)
