= List of canals in Poland =

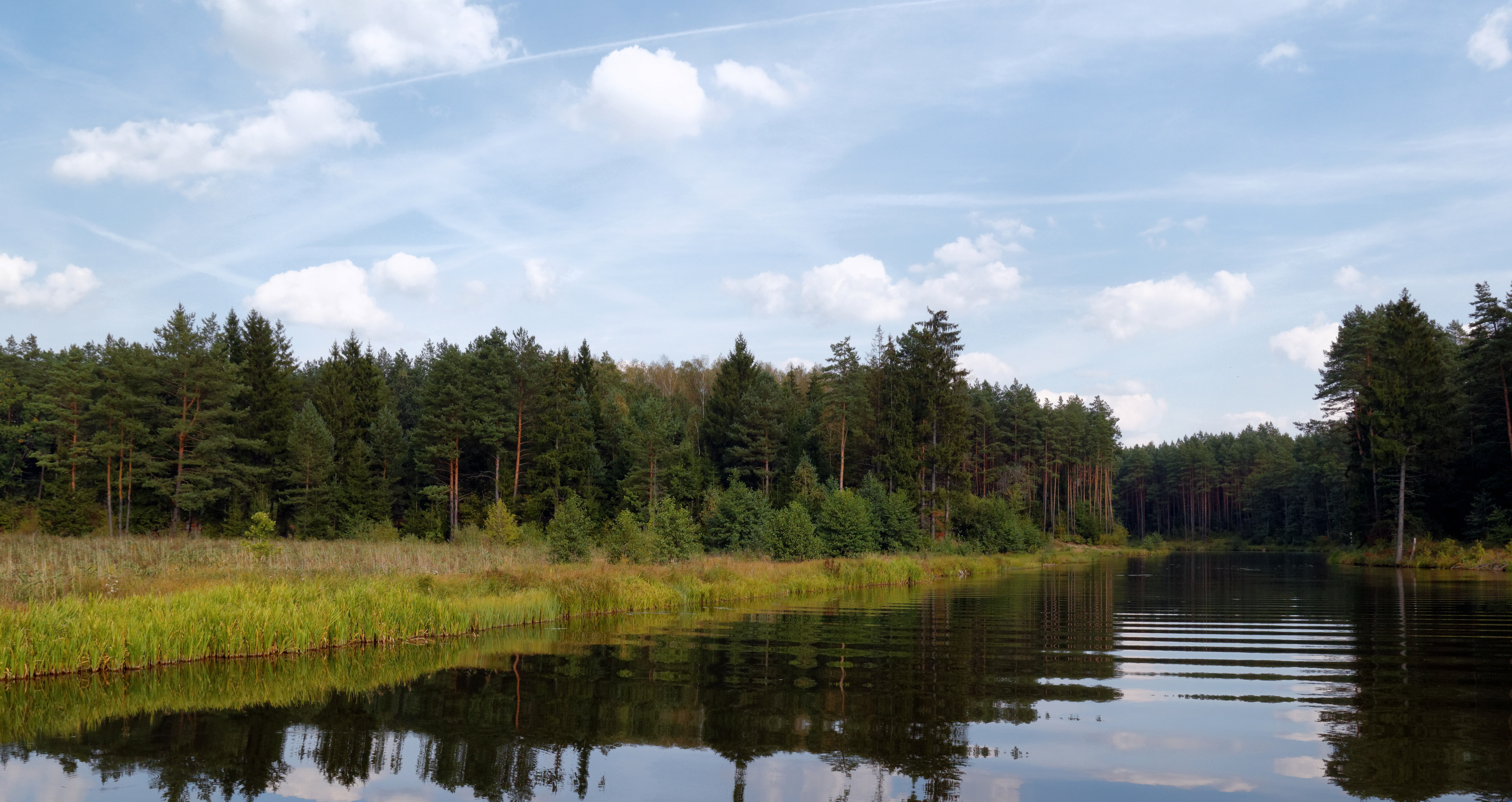
Augustów Canal, listed as a Historic Monument of Poland as one of the most precious heritage sites of its kind in the country

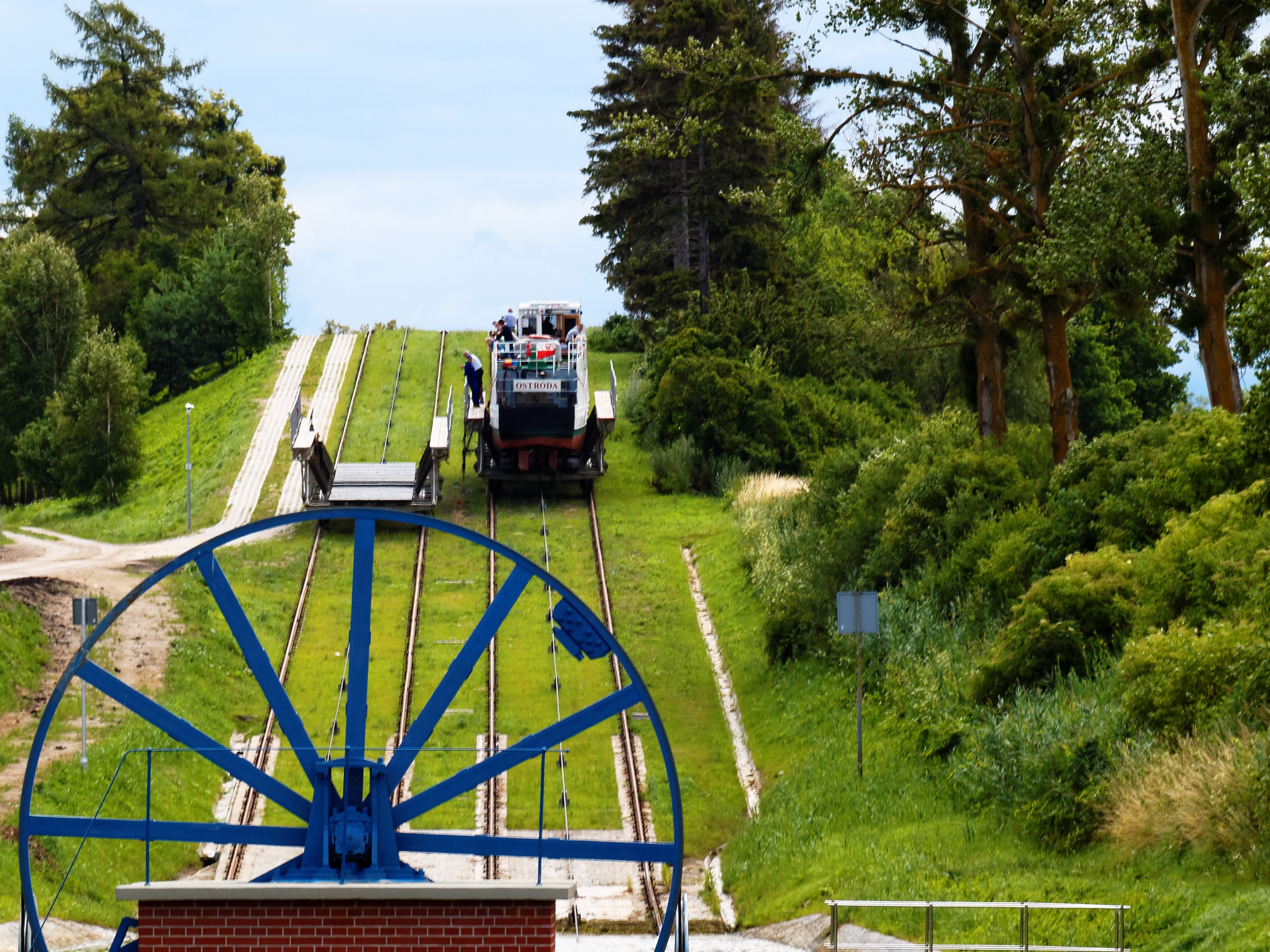
Elbląg Canal, listed as a Historic Monument of Poland as one of the most precious heritage sites of its kind in the country

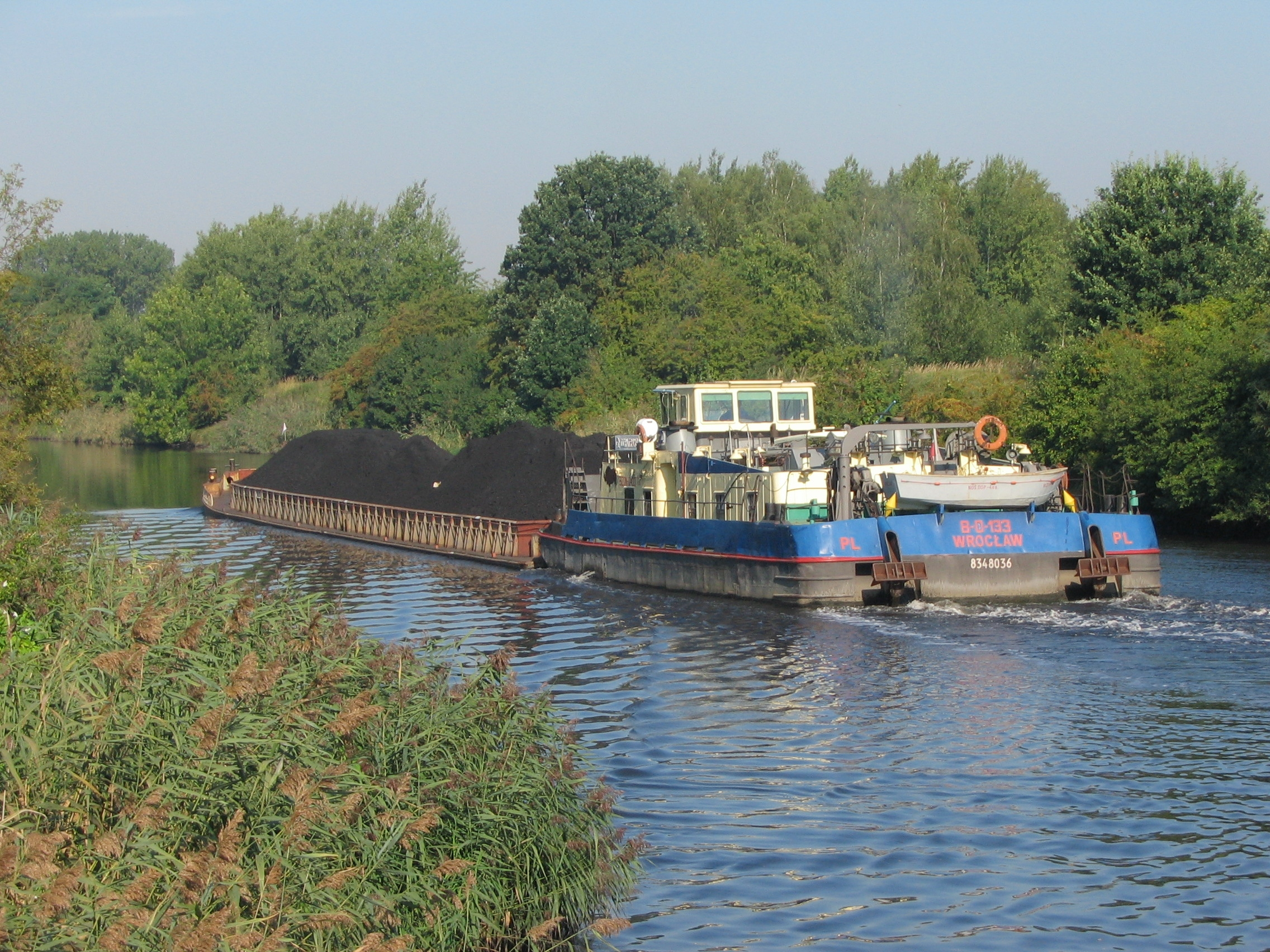
Freight vessel on the Gliwice Canal

This is a list of navigable canals that are at least partially located in Poland.

- Augustów Canal
- Bachorze Canal first mention 1297
- Bernardyński Canal
- Bydgoszcz Canal
- Bystry Canal
- Danube–Oder Canal
- Dębicki Canal in Szczecin
- Dobrzycki Canal
- Ducki Canal
- Elbląg Canal
- Gliwice Canal
- Grabowski Canal in Szczecin
- Grodzki Canal in Szczecin
- Iława Canal
- Jagiellonian Canal near Elbląg, built in 1494
- Jeglin Canal in the Masurian Lake District
- Kashubian Canal in Gdańsk
- Kędzierzyn Canal in Kędzierzyn-Koźle
- Kłodnica Canal
- Leśny Canal in Szczecin
- Kula Canal in the Masurian Lake District
- Łączański Canal near Kraków
- Łuczański Canal in the Masurian Lake District
- Masurian Canal
- Mielin Canal
- Mioduński Canal in the Masurian Lake District
- Młynówka Malborska or Jurand's Canal, built in 1320
- Mosiński Canal
- Nidzki Canal in the Masurian Lake District
- Niegocin Canal in the Masurian Lake District
- Notecki Canal
- Piast Canal
- Piękna Góra Canal in the Masurian Lake District
- Portowy Canal in Gdańsk
- Przekop
- Skolwiński Canal in Szczecin
- Szlak Batorego
- Sztynort Canal in the Masurian Lake District
- Szymon Canal in the Masurian Lake District
- Ślesiński Canal
- Tałcki Canal in the Masurian Lake District
- Vistula Spit canal
- Węgorzewo Canal in Węgorzewo in the Masurian Lake District
- Wołczkowski Canal
- Wrocławski Canal in Szczecin
- Żerański Canal

== See also ==
- Transport in Poland
- List of rivers of Poland
- Map of canals of Poland on the website of the Polish National Water Management Authority
