= Republic of Mosina =

19th century short-lived state proclaimed in town of Mosina

Republic of Mosina Rzeczpospolita Mosińska (Polish)
- 1848–1848
- Capital: Mosina
- Official languages: Polish
- Government: Republic
- Head of State
  - 1848: Jakub Krotowski-Krauthofer
- History
  - Declaration of independence: 3 May 1848
  - Battle of Rogalin: 8 May 1848
  - Capitulation in Bardo: 9 May 1848
Preceded by	Succeeded by
Kingdom of Prussia	Kingdom of Prussia
- Today part of: Poland

Republic of Mosina (Polish: Rzeczpospolita Mosińska) was a short-lived microstate centred around the city of Mosina, which existed for five or six days in May 1848. The country was proclaimed on 3 May 1848, during the Greater Poland uprising, out of the rebel-controlled lands of Grand Duchy of Posen, Kingdom of Prussia, with lawyer Jakub Krotowski-Krauthofer as its head of state. The republic ceased to exist five or six days later, on 8 or 9 May 1848 after the defeat of rebel forces.

The state was meant to be a temporary entity, that later would be reformed into an independent Polish state, that rebels had aimed to recreate. The capital of the country was Mosina and official language was Polish.

== History ==
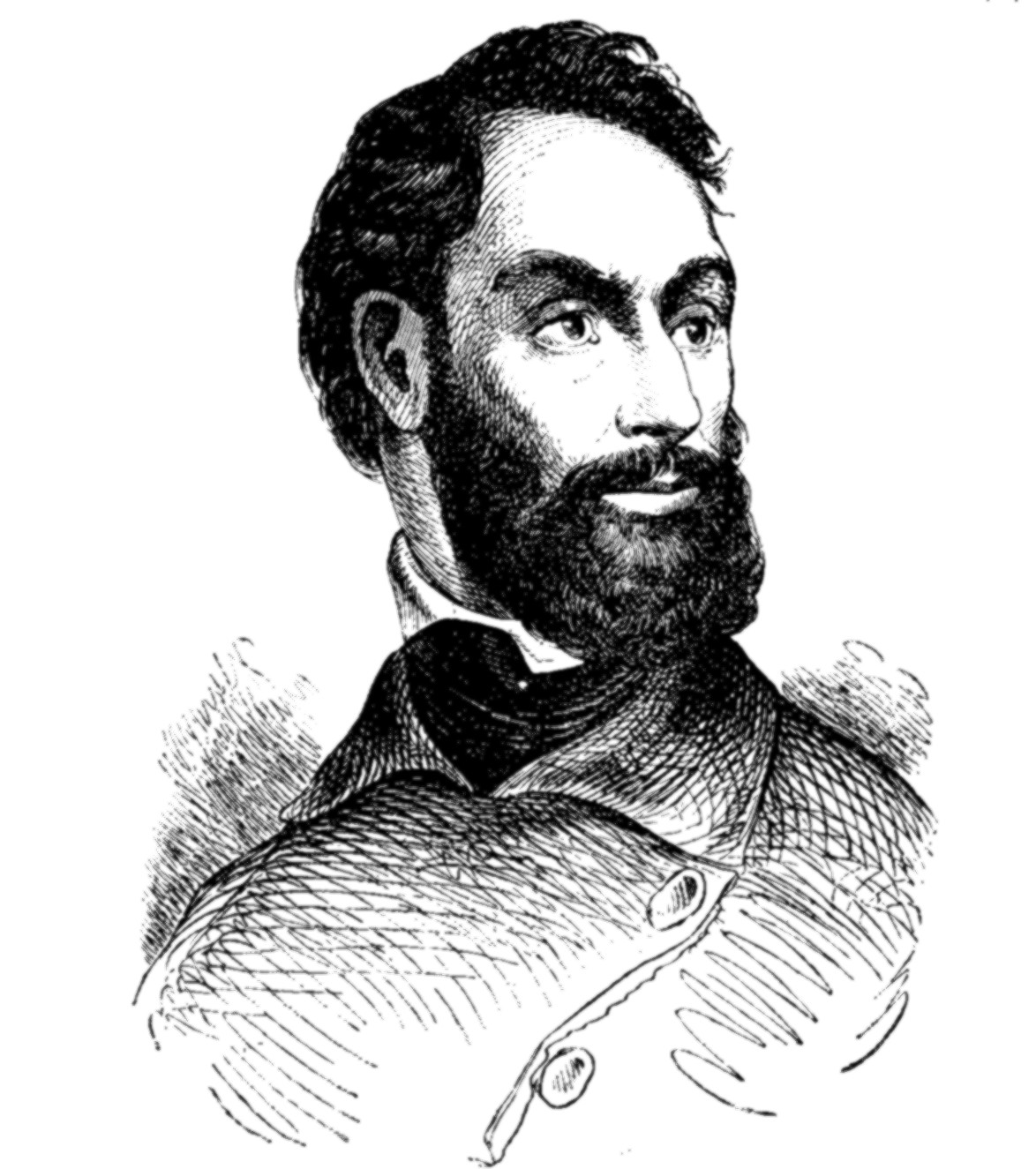
Jakub Krauthofer-Krotowski, head of state of the republic

In March 1848, during Greater Poland uprising, the revolutionary forces had formed the National Committee in rebel-controlled city of Mosina, in Grand Duchy of Posen, Kingdom of Prussia, with Wojciech Rost, Antoni Adamski, Stanisław Stefanowicz, Jan Kordylewski and Antoni Ruszkiewicz as its members. On 3 May 1848, the leader of insurgent forces, Jakub Krauthofer-Krotowski had declared the formation of the independent Republic of Mosina in the area around the cities Mosina and Kórnik and made himself a head of state. The state was meant to be a temporary entity, that later would be reformed into an independent Polish state, that rebels had aimed to recreate. Mosina was decided to be the capital of the state. Following the declaration of the country's independence, Krotowski-Krauthofer had replaced Prussian government officials in the area with Polish ones, including appointing Wojciech Rost as the new mayor of Mosina.

The republic ceased to exist five days later, on 8 May 1848, after the rebels defeat in the Battle of Rogalin, or a day later, on 9 May, after the clash in Trzebaw and following rebel capitulation in Bardo ending the uprising. Following the capitulation, Krauthofer-Krotowski was imprisoned in Konatrzewo.

== Bibliography ==
- Krótki sen o Polsce by Joanna Nowaczyk. Żołnierze Wolności [access date: 2019-04-26].
- Nieznana karta Wiosny Ludów. Polska miała przez 5 dni własną, niepodległą stolicę by Marcin Tomczak. histmag.org. [access date: 2019-04-26].
- Jakub Krotowski-Krauthofer in *Wielkopolski Słownik Biograficzny by Zdzisław Grot. Warsaw/Poznań. 1981.
