= Mosina =

Town in Greater Poland Voivodeship, Poland

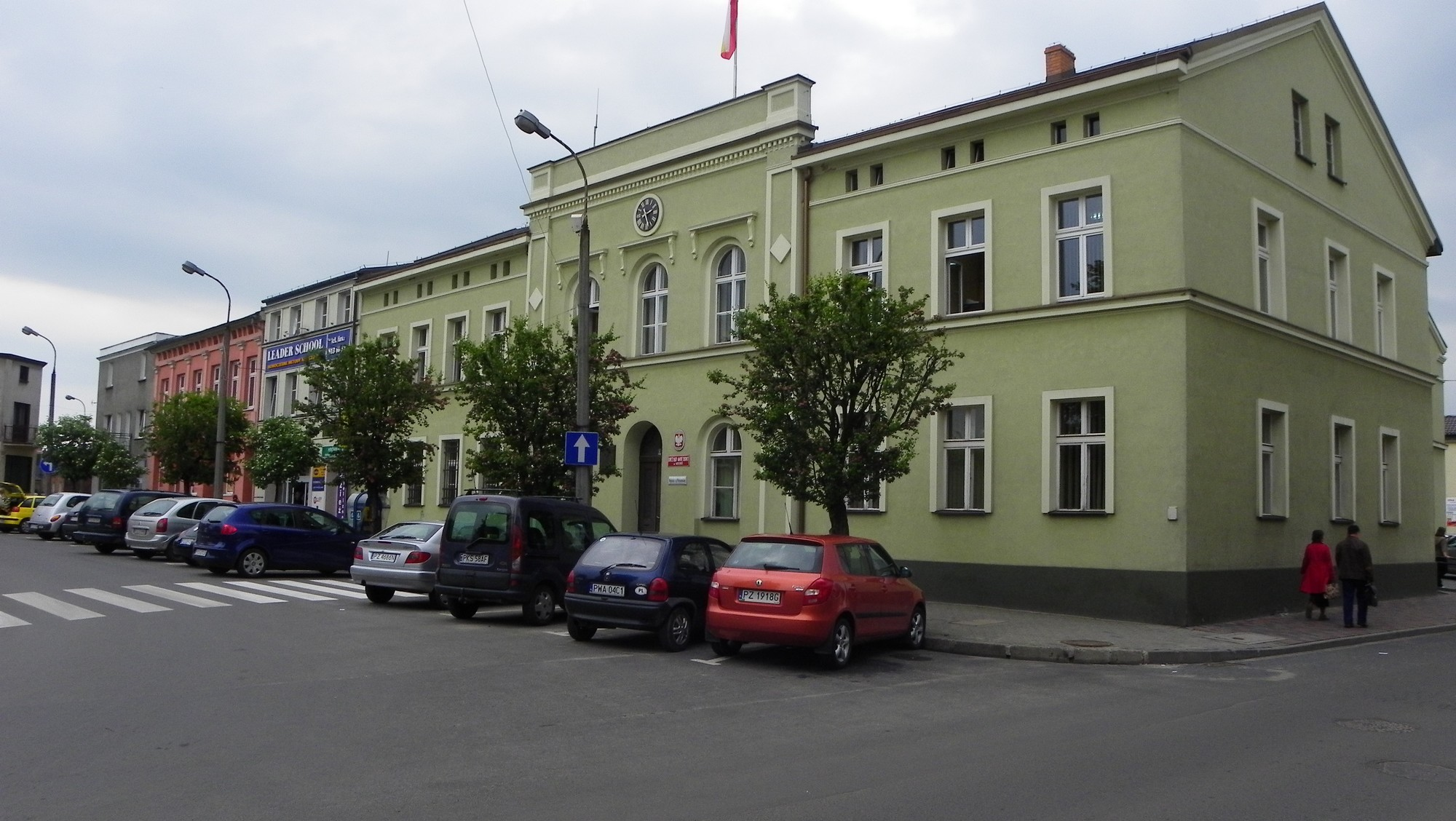
- Town hall

- Flag Coat of arms

- Location within Poland
- Coordinates: 52°14′48″N 16°50′42″E
- Country: Poland
- Voivodeship: Greater Poland
- County: Poznań
- Gmina: Mosina
- First mentioned: 1247
- Town rights: before 1302

Area
  - Total: 13.58 km^{2} (5.24 sq mi)

Population (2021)
  - Total: 14,511
  - Density: 1,069/km^{2} (2,768/sq mi)
- Time zone: UTC+1 (CET)
  - Summer (DST): UTC+2 (CEST)
- Postal code: 62-050
- Vehicle registration: PZ, PO
- Climate: Cfb
- Primary airport: Poznań–Ławica Airport
- Website: http://www.mosina.pl

Mosina [mɔˈɕina] is a town in Poznań County, Greater Poland Voivodeship, in west-central Poland, 21 km (13 mi) south of Poznań, with 12,107 inhabitants (2004). The Mosiński Canal runs east and west through the town, and joins the Warta River just to the east.

== Etymology ==
The name is of Polish origin and comes from the Old Polish word moszyna, meaning a place covered with moss, and originally referred to a river.

== History ==
=== Early history ===
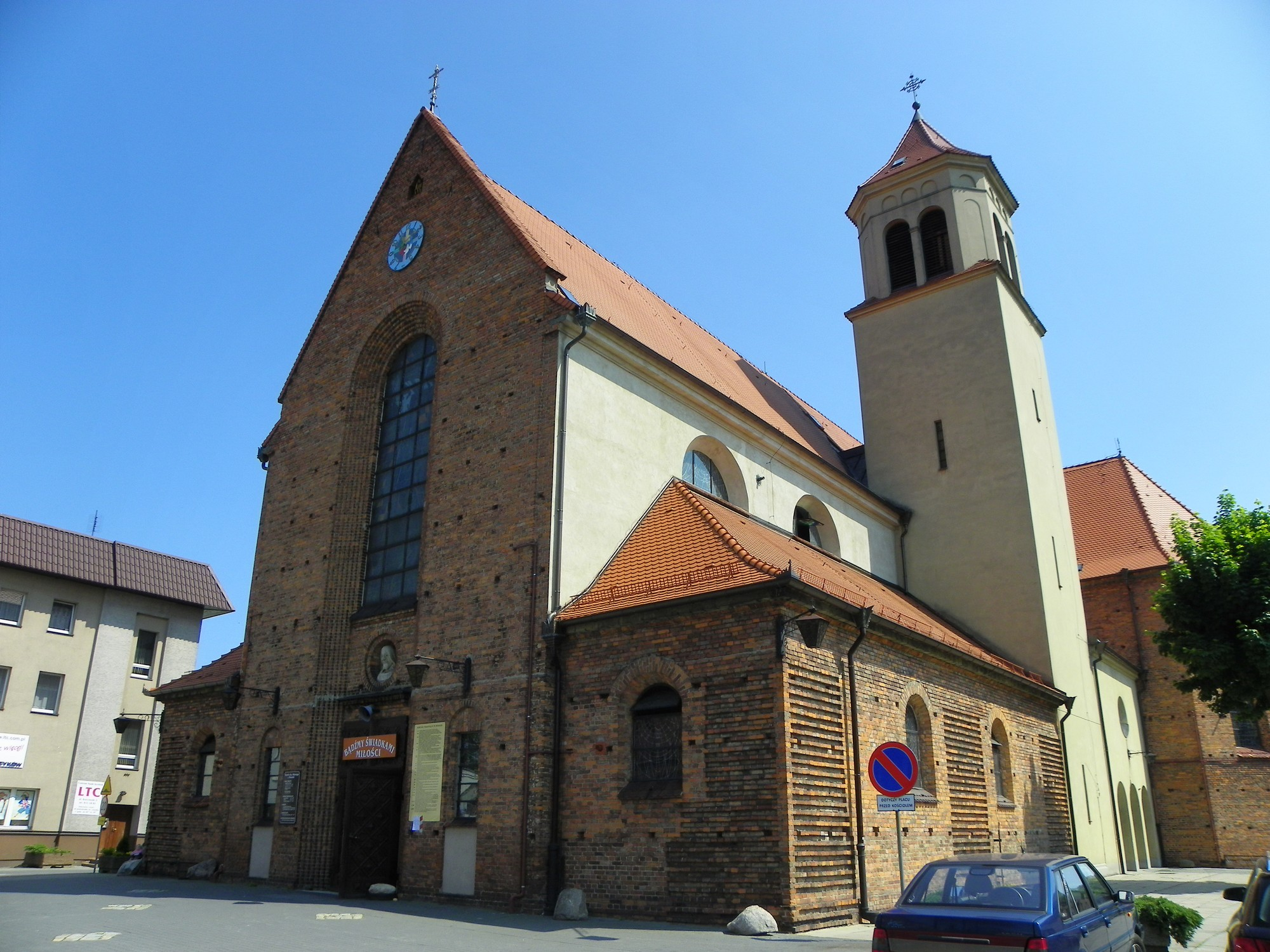
Saint Nicholas church

The oldest known mention of Mosina comes from 1247, while in 1302 it was mentioned as a town. It was granted town rights by Kalisz voivode Mikołaj Przedpełkowic in c. 1302. The actual location did not occur until 1429, when King Władysław II Jagiełło granted Mosina Magdeburg rights, confirmed by subsequent Polish rulers. For centuries, Mosina was a royal town of the Kingdom of Poland, administratively located in the Poznań County in the Poznań Voivodeship in the Greater Poland Province. In the winter of 1659 and 1660, half of Stefan Czarniecki's banner was stationed in the town on its way from an expedition to liberate Denmark from Swedish occupation. The diarist Jan Chryzostom Pasek stopped here with them to convalesce after a bout of severe typhus. In 1761, the local Riflemen's Brotherhood was founded.

=== Late modern period ===
It was annexed by Prussia in the Second Partition of Poland in 1793, and during the period of the Partitions of Poland, Mosina was known by its German name, Moschin. After the successful Greater Poland uprising of 1806, it was regained by Poles and included within the short-lived Duchy of Warsaw. Mosina was visited three times by Emperor Napoleon Bonaparte, in 1807 during an inspection of the territories, in 1812 when he marched on Moscow and when, defeated, he returned to Paris. After the duchy's dissolution the town was re-annexed by Prussia in 1815.

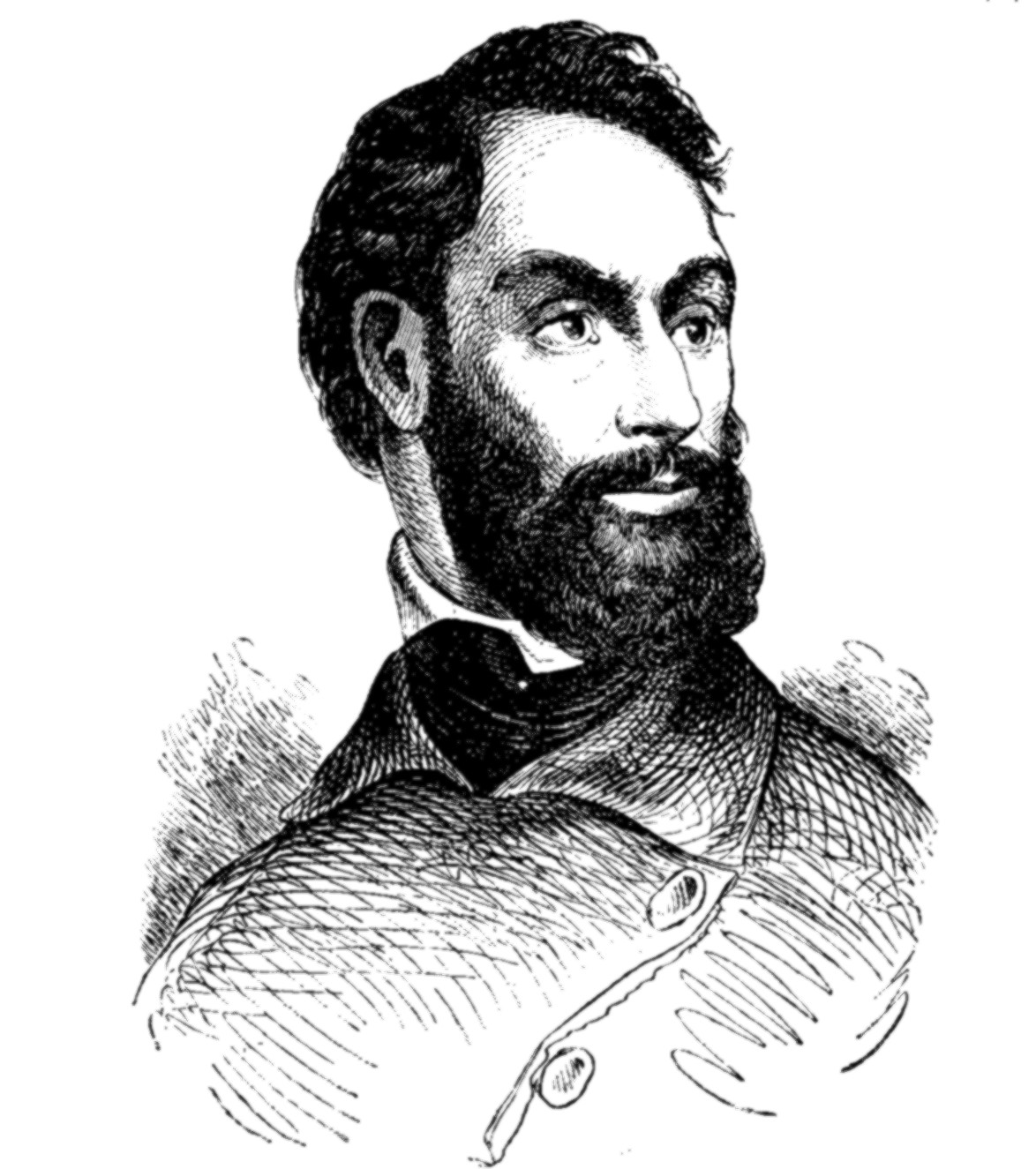
Jakub Krotowski-Krauthofer

During the Polish Greater Poland uprising and the European Spring of Nations, on May 3, 1848, Polish lawyer Jakub Krotowski-Krauthofer declared Polish independence in Mosina. The small Polish republic centered in Mosina was eventually crushed by the Prussians after their victory over the Polish insurgents at the Battle of Rogalin several days later. Jakub Krotowski-Krauthofer was captured in Konarzewo and then brutally treated, before being released in 1849 by amnesty.

The construction of the railway line from Poznań to Wrocław, which was launched in 1856, contributed to the significant economic revival of the town. At the end of the 19th century, several local Polish organizations were established to resist Germanisation policies. In 1902, a volunteer fire brigade was established, in 1907 the Polish People's Bank was founded, in 1909 a local branch of the Sokół movement was established.

Poland eventually regained independence after World War I in 1918, and then locals fought in the Greater Poland Uprising to reunite the region with Poland. Insurgents from Mosina fought as part of the Śrem battalion on the western front of the uprising and near Rawicz.

In the interbellum Mosina administratively belonged to the Poznań Voivodeship. Mosina developed greatly in the interwar period. In 1928, Stefan Kałamajski launched a steam dyeworks and dry cleaning company "Barwa", which provided work for about 300 people. The Perkiewicz Ceramic Works (established in 1886) employed over 200 people.

=== World War II ===
Following the joint German-Soviet invasion of Poland, which started World War II in September 1939, the town was occupied by Germany until 1945 and local Poles were subjected to extensive genocidal policies. German troops entered the town on September 9, 1939. First arrests of local Poles were carried out on September 17–18. The hostages were held at the local synagogue. On October 20, 1939, the German Einsatzgruppe VI carried out a public execution of 15 Polish hostages as part of the Intelligenzaktion. Among the victims were teachers, doctors, merchants and craftsmen from Mosina and nearby villages. It was one of many massacres of Poles committed that day by Germany across the region in attempt to pacify and terrorize the Polish population. Poles from Mosina were also murdered by the German police and Selbstschutz in the nearby town of Murowana Goślina in September and November 1939. Numerous murders were committed in the Mosina forests in the years 1940-1943.

In 1939–1941, the occupiers carried out expulsions of Poles, whose houses, shops and workshops were then handed over to German colonists as part of the Lebensraum policy. In 1943, many Polish children were kidnapped and imprisoned by the Germans in a camp for Polish children in Łódź, which was nicknamed "little Auschwitz" due to its conditions. Many children died in the camp. 57 families (225 people) were displaced, 513 people were arrested and placed in extermination camps, including 58 children.

The Polish resistance was active in the town, including the Union of Armed Struggle, the Home Army, the Retaliation Union, and the Grey Ranks.

The town was captured by the Red Army on January 25, 1945, and then restored to Poland. Soon local government elections were held in the market square. The first post-war mayor was Maciej Nowaczyk.

=== Post-war period ===
After the war, Mosina was one of the most intensively developing towns in Greater Poland.

The Mosina Cultural Centre, Museum Chamber and Municipal Gallery were founded in 1971, 1985 and 1993, respectively. At the turn of the 80s and 90s, several factories declared bankruptcy.

== Sports ==
The local football club is KS 1920 Mosina. It competes in the lower leagues.

The Mosiński Klub Żeglarski (Mosina Sailing Club) was founded in 1991.

== Notable residents ==
- Friedrich Bauer, (1812-1874), German missionary
- Lazarus Immanuel Fuchs (1833–1902), German mathematician
- Herbert Baum (1912–1942), German resistance fighter
- Monika Jagaciak (1994-), Polish model
