= Orla coat of arms =

Polish coat of arms

Orla
- Alternative names: Saszor (Szaszor) and Opola, Opala or Zapale, Mściug
- Earliest mention: c. 14th century as Saszor subsequently also Orla arms
- Towns: various territorial manors owned by its members
- Families: Earliest mentioned member bearers (in order of precedence): * House of Saszowski (historically equally written as Szaszowski, Schaschowsky, Saschowsky et al.) arms Saszor; and its branch scions alias Palczowski and Gierałtowski (equally spelt Geraltowski) * House of Barski (equally Bardzki) * House of Chobienicki * Jorogniewski * Kełbowski (equally Kielbowski) arms Opala * Ligocki (equally Lgocki)

Orla (derived from Polish orzeł 'eagle') is a distinct Polish armorial estate and heraldic clan coat of arms adopted in Polish heraldry since the Crown of the Kingdom of Poland. It was vested upon several knightly families of Poland's nobility in the historical regions of the Duchy of Greater Poland, the Duchies of Silesia, and the Lesser Poland Province from about the 14th century onwards. It was first historically known in the Crown of the Kingdom of Poland as the coat of arms of 'Saszor' (Szaszor), later derived as the 'Orla' arms, and subsequently conferred on the ennoblement of several individuals.

== History ==
Orla is one of the oldest Polish coats of arms. The coat of arms was naturalised into Polish heraldry during the Jagiellonian dynasty and is derived from its Roman-German origin, attributed to the personal coat of arms borne by the House of Saszowski and its branch scions. This coat of arms, known specifically as the Saszor arms, was held distinct to this family and its members.

Following its general designation as Orla, it was subsequently borne by several unrelated Polish knightly families and individuals connected by heraldic adoption at ennoblement. As frequently found with Polish coats of arms, it was borne by some supposed members misattributed to the heraldic clan by error or usurpation.

== Blazon ==
Silver (Argent), an eagle displayed headless red (Gules), on the neck a star of six rays red (gules); N.B. the star, as well as the eagle claws, are often found represented (rightly or wrongly) as gold (Or) tincture in Polish heraldic literature.

== Notable member bearers ==
From the classical Polish heraldic reference Herby rycerstwa polskiego (Armorials of Polish Knights) published in 1584 by Bartosz Paprocki, bearers are shown in order of precedence:

- House of Saszowski (historically equally written as Szaszowski, Schaschowsky, Saschowsky et al.), and its branch scions alias Palczowski and Gierałtowski.
  - Jakub Saszowski of Gierałtowic (equally known as Gierałtowski), Burgrave of Kraków and Wawel Royal Castle
  - Jan Wilamowski (also Jan z Gierałtowic Wilamowski), Bishop of Kamianets (1540)
  - Zygmunt Saszowski of Palczowic (equally known as Palczowski), (b. 1530, d. 1587), Burgrave of Kraków and Wawel Royal Castle
  - Jan Palczowski of Palczowic (b. about 1507, d. 1565)
  - Krzysztof Palczowski of Palczowic (b. about 1568, d. 1627)
  - Paweł Palczowski of Palczowic (b. about 1570, d. about 1609)
- House of Barski
- House of Chobienicki

and the individuals:

- Jorogniewski
- Kełbowski
- Ligocki

== See also ==
- Polish heraldry
- Heraldic clan
- Szlachta
- Coat of arms
- Szaszor
