= Bardo, Greater Poland Voivodeship =

Bardo
- Village
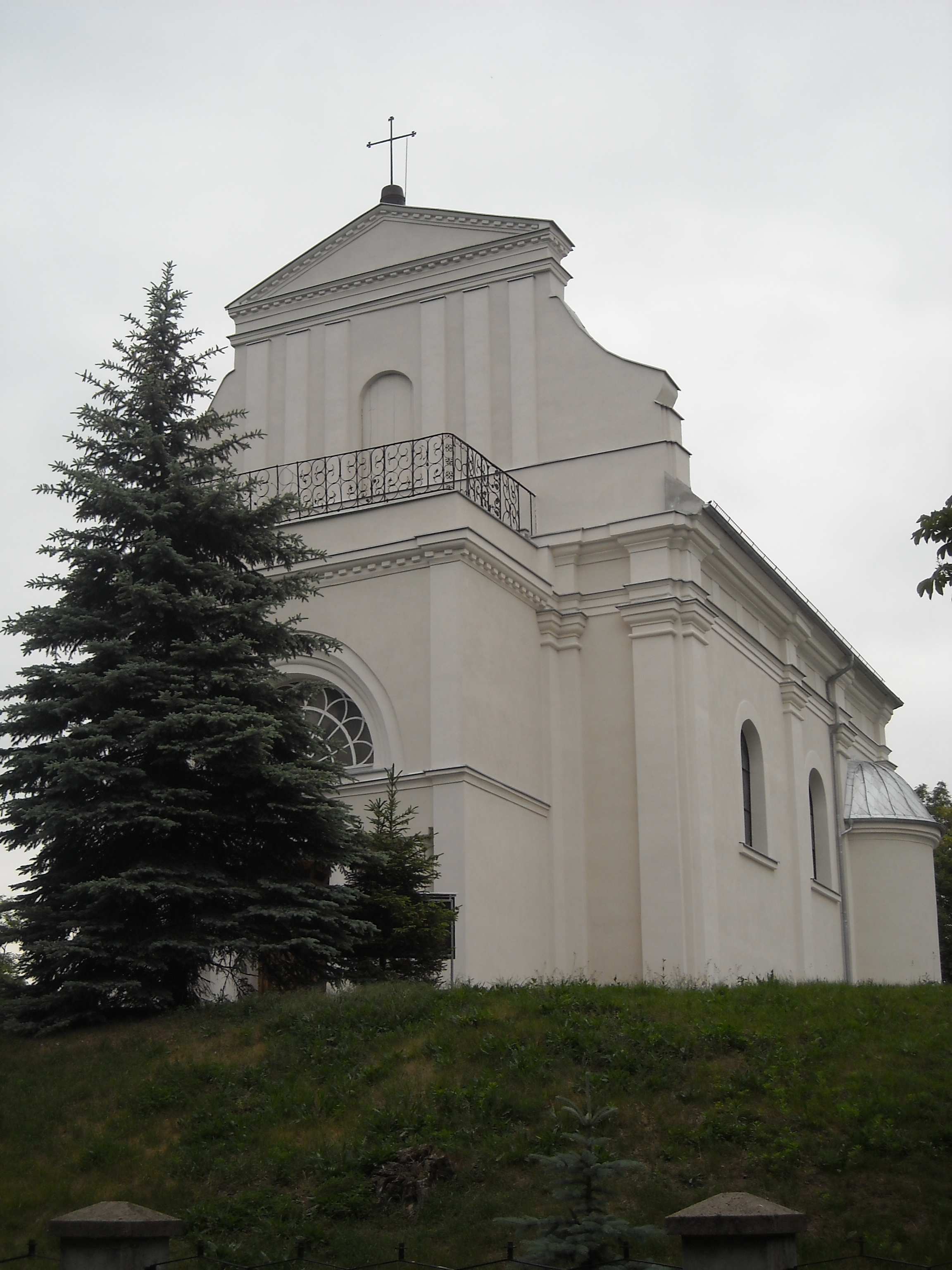
- Saint Nicholas church in Bardo

- Location within Poland
- Coordinates: 52°16′33″N 17°29′39″E
- Country: Poland
- Voivodeship: Greater Poland
- County: Września
- Gmina: Września
- Population: 240
- Time zone: UTC+1 (CET)
  - Summer (DST): UTC+2 (CEST)
- Vehicle registration: DWR

Bardo [ˈbardɔ] is a village in the administrative district of Gmina Września, within Września County, Greater Poland Voivodeship, in west-central Poland.

== History ==
Bardo was a private village of Polish nobility, including the Bardski family of Szaszor coat of arms and Skrzetuski family of Jastrzębiec coat of arms, administratively located in the Pyzdry County in the Kalisz Voivodeship in the Greater Poland Province of the Kingdom of Poland.

By 1880, it had a population of 181.
