= Kanał Wołczkowski =

Canal in Poland

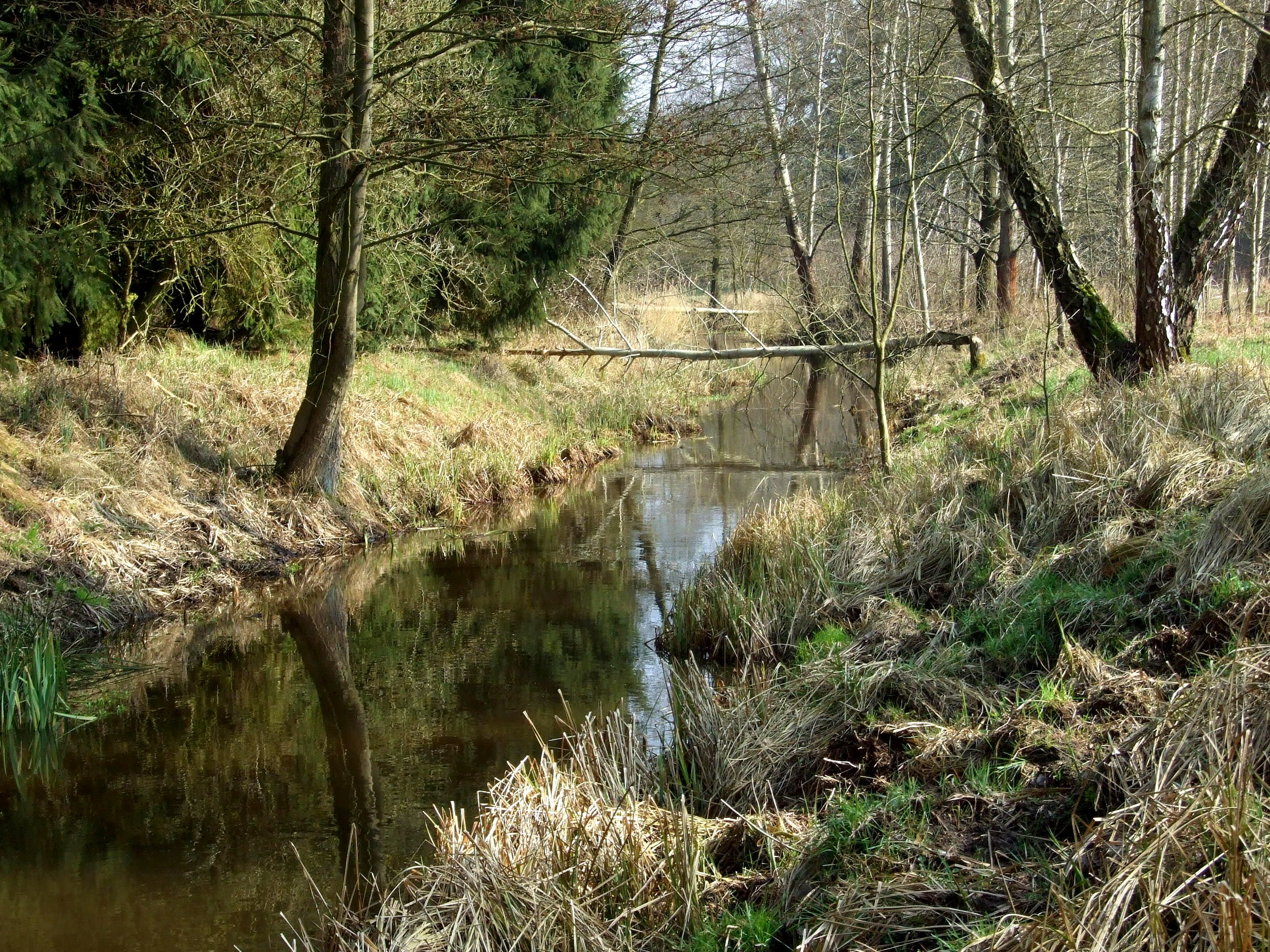
- Country: Poland

Specifications
- Length: 11.93 km (7.41 miles)

Geography
- Direction: North
- Start point: Wawelnica
- End point: Gunica River
- Beginning coordinates: 53.450°N 14.416°E
- Ending coordinates: 53°32′40″N 14°25′05″E

Kanał Wołczkowski is a canal of Poland, a tributary of the Gunica.

The canal has a length of 11.93 kilometres (7.41 mi), and has a basin size of 51.2 square kilometres (19.8 sq mi). The average flow is about 148 m^{3}/h (5,200 cu ft/h)
