= Mosiński Canal =

Canal in western Poland

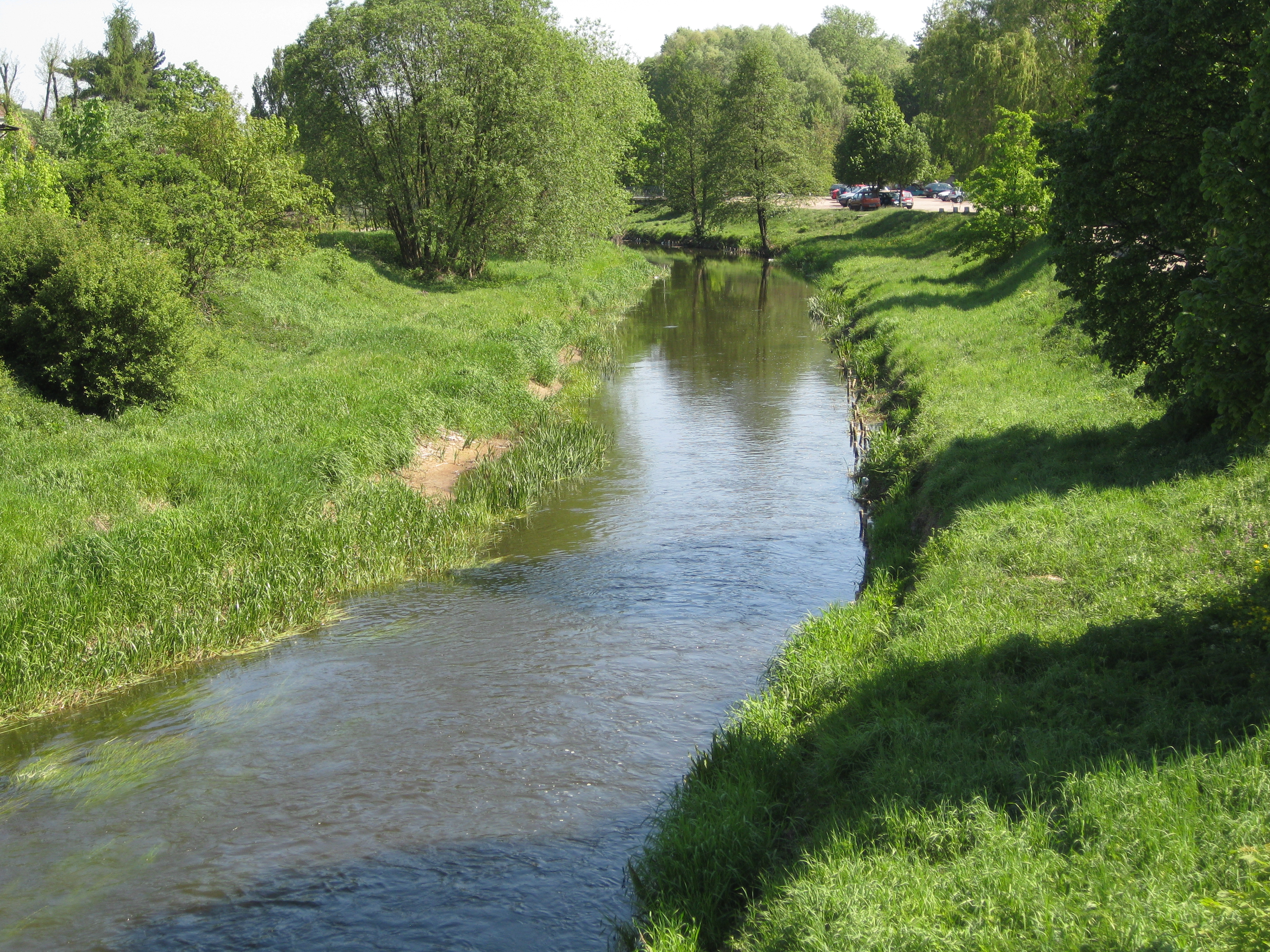
- Country: Poland

Specifications
- Length: 15 km (9.3 miles)

Geography
- Direction: Northeast
- Start point: near Koscian
- End point: Warta River
- Beginning coordinates: 52.115°N 16.609°E
- Ending coordinates: 52.253°N 16.886°E

The Mosiński Canal (Polish: Kanał Mosiński) is a canalized branch of the Obra River running entirely within western-central Poland. It connects the Warta River at the village of Mosina (52.253175°N 16.885720°E), then runs roughly east to an intersection with other Obra canals at a point north of Kościan 52.114828°N 16.609389°E.

The canal has a length of about 26 kilometers, and was built in the middle of the 1800s. In Borkowice, close to Mosina, a small hydroelectric plant built in the 1990s interrupts the channel.

Mosiński Canal is one of the four Obrzańskich channels in the Obra watershed. The others are the Kanał Północny, the Kanał Środkowy, and the "Island" canals which connect to the Obrzyca River.
