= Szlak Batorego =

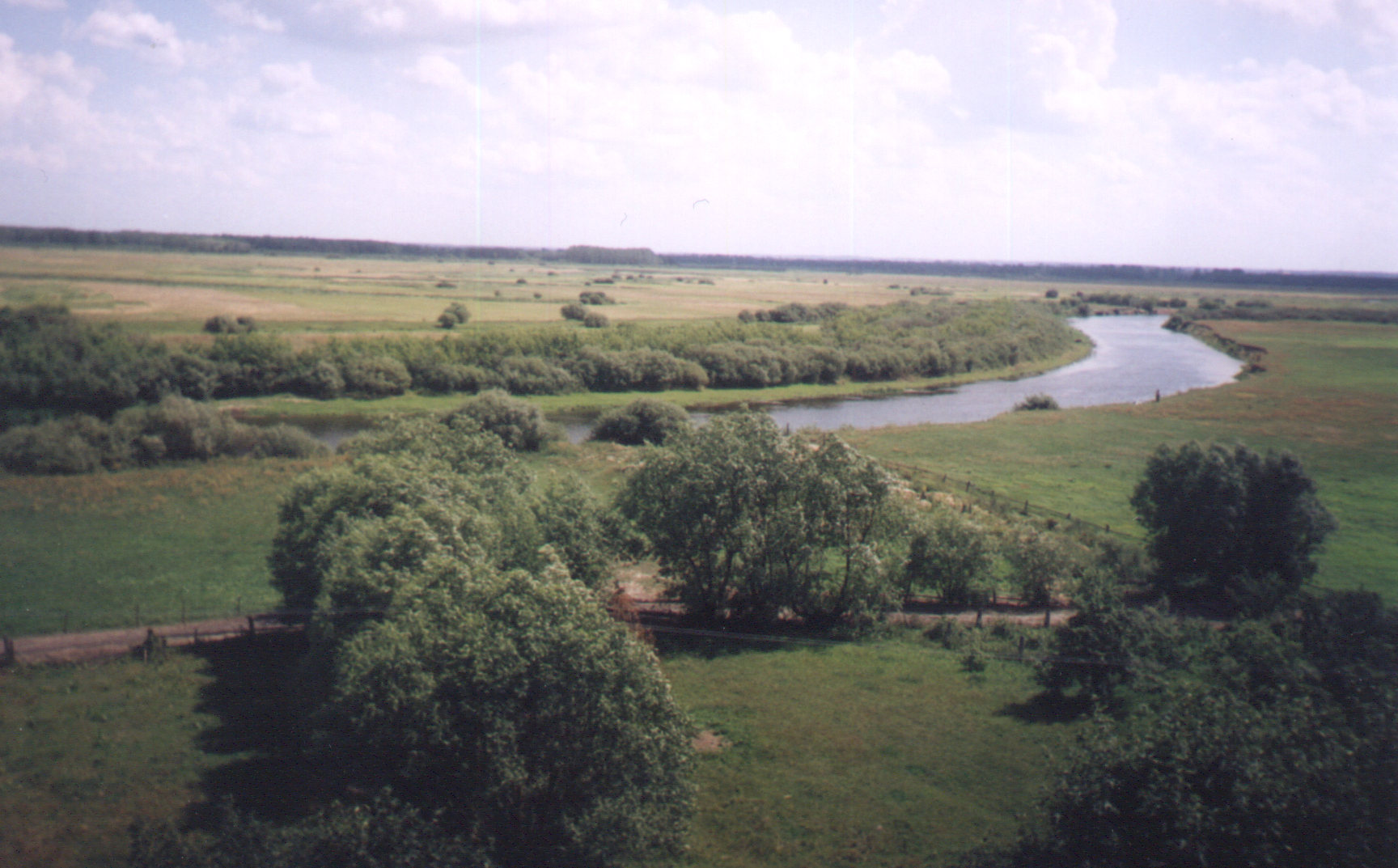
- The Narew near Wizna, which is part of the waterway
- Country: Poland

Geography
- Start point: near Augustów
- End point: Gdańsk
- Beginning coordinates: 53.872°N 23.524°E
- Ending coordinates: 54.359°N 18.951°E

Szlak Batorego (Trail of Báthory) is a manmade waterway in Poland first developed during the reign of Stephen Báthory in the 1600s. It connects the Zegrze Reservoir, the Narew, the Biebrza, the Augustów Canal, and the Neman River.

On July 16, 2007, the tourism board in Warsaw established the "King Stephen Báthory Trail" as a recreational trail. This trail includes the cities of: Frombork, Elbląg, Malbork, Sztum, Grudziądz, Bydgoszcz, Solec Kujawski, Toruń, Włocławek, Płock, Warsaw, Serock, Pułtusk, Ostrołęka, Łomża, and Augustów, along with Hrodna in Belarus and Druskininkai in Lithuania.
