= Łuczański Canal =

Canal in Poland

Łuczański Canal Kanał Łuczański
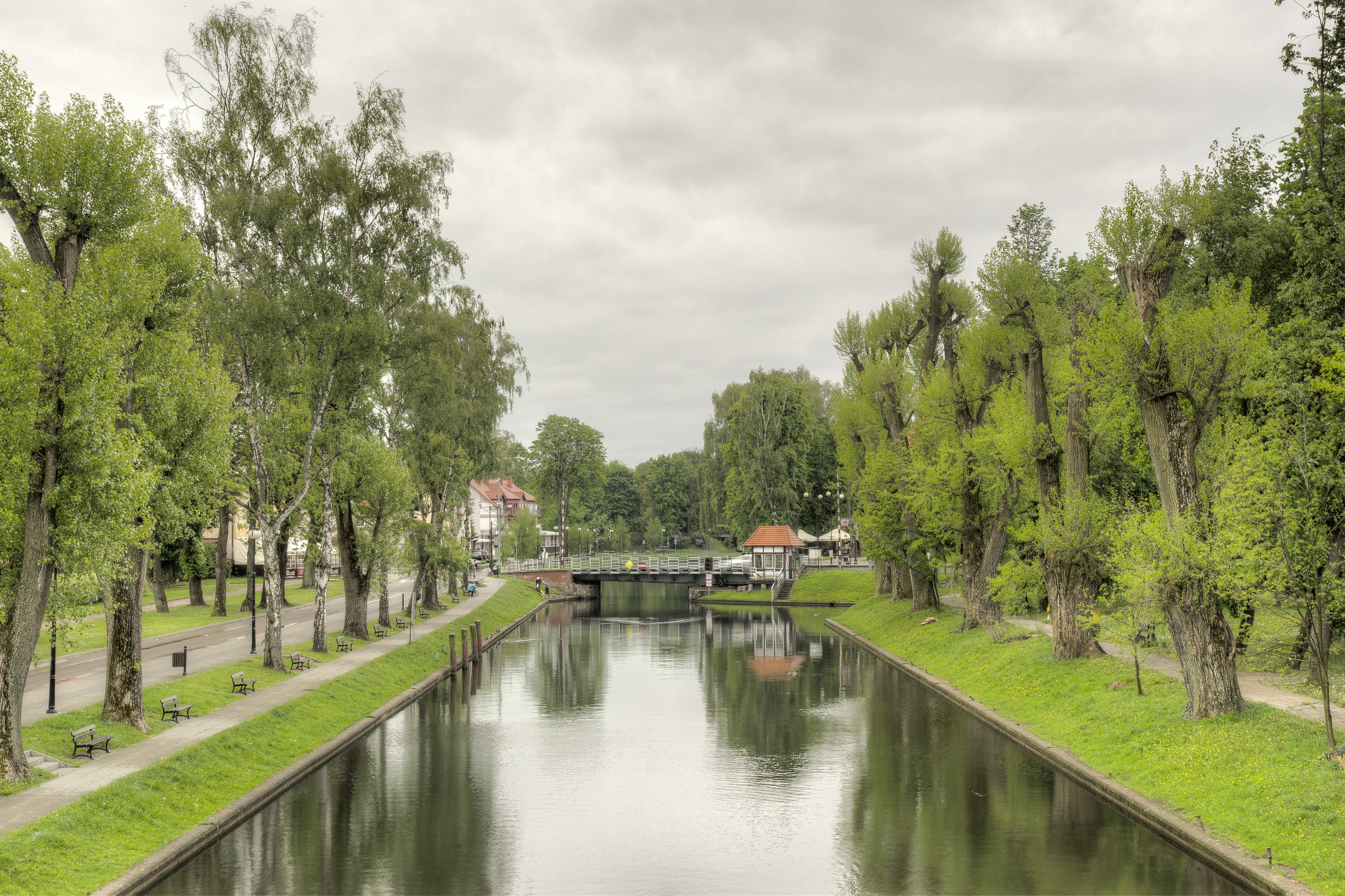
- Location: Giżycko, Warmian–Masurian Voivodeship
- Country: Poland

Specifications
- Length: 2.13 km (1.32 miles)

History
- Construction began: 1765
- Date completed: 1772

Geography
- Beginning coordinates: 54°01′55″N 21°45′46″E
- Ending coordinates: 54°02′58″N 21°45′20″E

The Łuczański Canal (Polish Kanał Łuczański; German: Lötzener Kanal) is a Masurian canal connecting Lake Niegocin with Lake Kisajno (bay of Tracz).

== History and Information ==
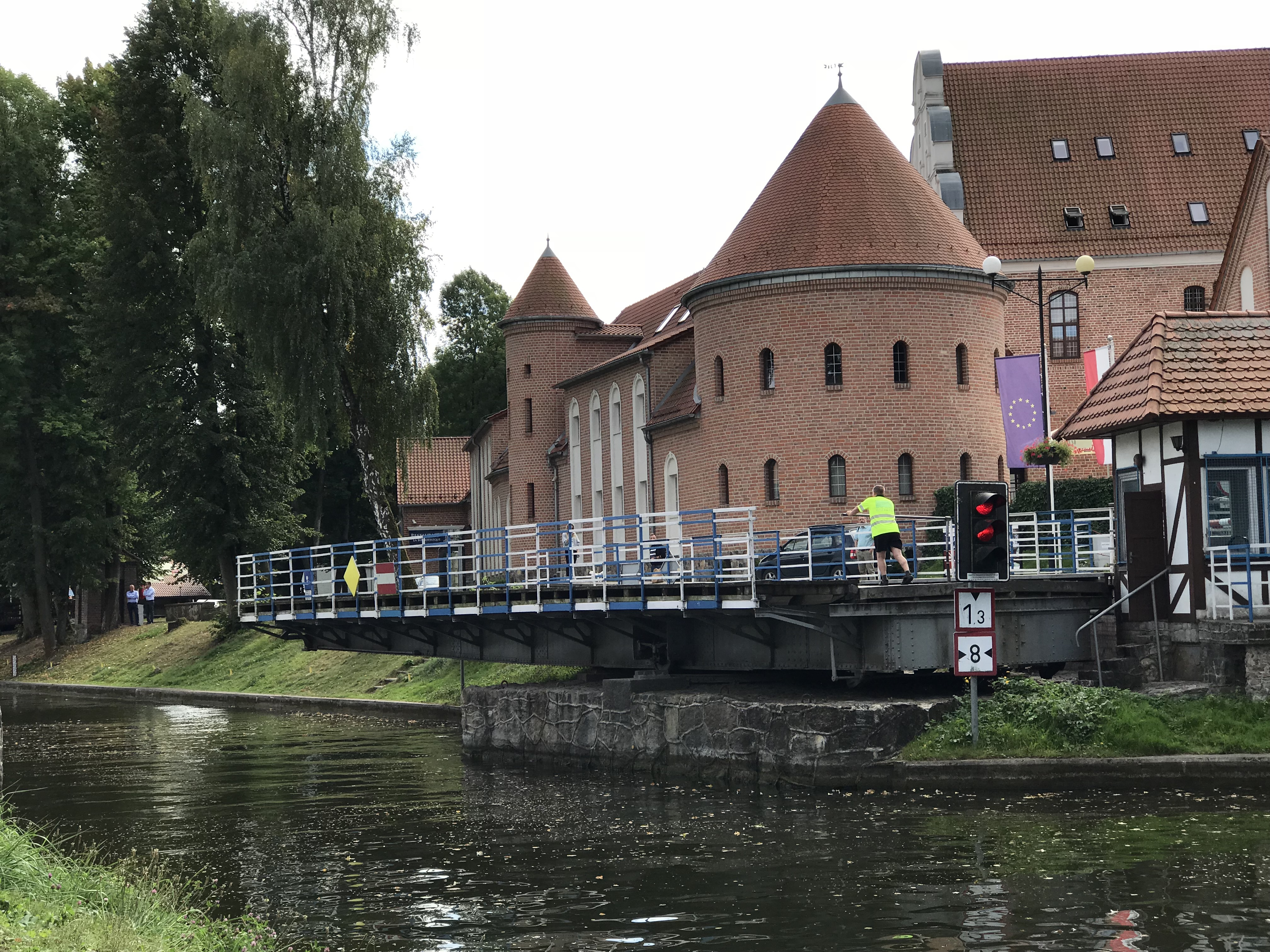
View of the open swing bridge on the Łuczański Canal

The canal was dug on the initiative of the Prussian authorities from 1765–1772.

The canal is 2.13 km long, with an average width of 12 m (9 m at the railway bridge).
