= Mioduński Canal =

Canal in Warmian-Masurian Voivodeship, Poland

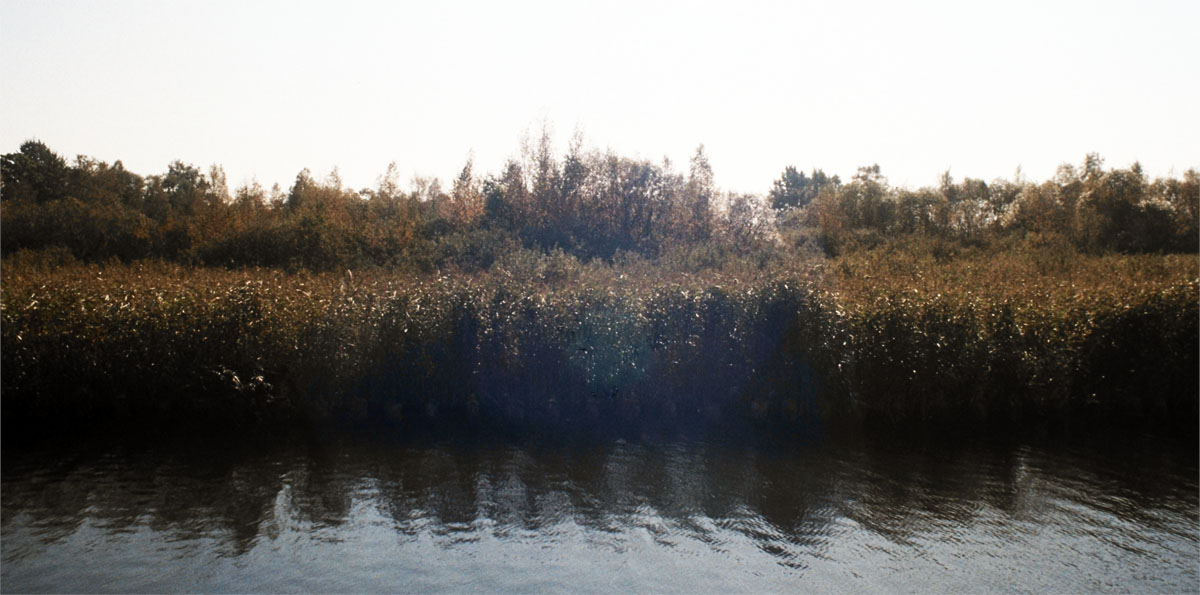
- Interactive map of Mioduński Canal
- Location: Warmian-Masurian Voivodeship
- Country: Poland
- Coordinates: 53.881944°N 21.628611°E

Geography
- Start point: Lake Kotek
- End point: Lake Szymon

The Mioduński Canal (Polish: Kanał Mioduński) (German: Immenhagener Kanal) is a Mazurian canal connecting the Kotek and Szymon lakes. The road from Ruciane-Nida, Pisz and Mikołajki to Węgorzewo (via Giżycko) passes through it.

== History ==
The canal was dug in 1764-1765, but in 1789 it, along with the surrounding canals, ceased to function. It was completely destroyed during the Napoleonic wars. The canal was rebuilt during public works carried out between 1854 and 1857.

== Surroundings ==
Near the entrance to the canal on Lake Szymon, there is the only floating restaurant in Masuria: Smażalnia Wędkarska.

== Bibliography ==
- S. Kulczyk, E. Tomczyk, T. Krzywicki, Kraina Wielkich Jezior, Wydawnictwo Pascal, Bielsko-Biała 2004, ISBN 83-7304-293-8.
- W. Kuczkowski, Szlak Wielkich Jezior Mazurskich, Warszawa-Giżycko: Wydawnictwo ARBOR DiG, 1993, ISBN 83-900217-9-X.
- Siemieński Krzysztof, Wielkie Jeziora Mazurskie – Od Pisza i Karwicy przez Mikołajki, Ryn, Giżycko do Węgorzewa, Rafał Sarna (red.), wyd. Wydanie II zaktualizowane, Warszawa: Nautica, 2021, ISBN 978-83-66846-03-6 (pol.).
