= Szaszor =

Heraldic charge in the shape of a headless eagle

Orla coat of arms.

Szaszor (Polish: [ˈʂa.ʂɔr]), also known as Saszor (Polish pronunciation: [ˈsa.ʂɔr]), is a heraldic charge in the shape of headless eagle.

== Usage ==
It was used in the Orla and Saszow coat of arms of heraldic clans of Poland. It is also used in the coat of arms and flag of the municipality of Rędziny, Silesian Voivodeship, Poland.

== Gallery ==
Saszow coat of arms of the House of Szaszowski.

Coat of arms of Gmina Rędziny.

== Bibliography ==
- Alfred Znamierowski, Heraldyka i weksylologia. Arkady, 2017. ISBN 978-83-213-4972-5.
- Aleksander Brückner, Słownik etymologiczny języka polskiego, Kraków, Wydawnictwo Krakowska Spółka Wydawnicza, 1927.
