= Konarzewo, Poznań County =

Konarzewo
- Village
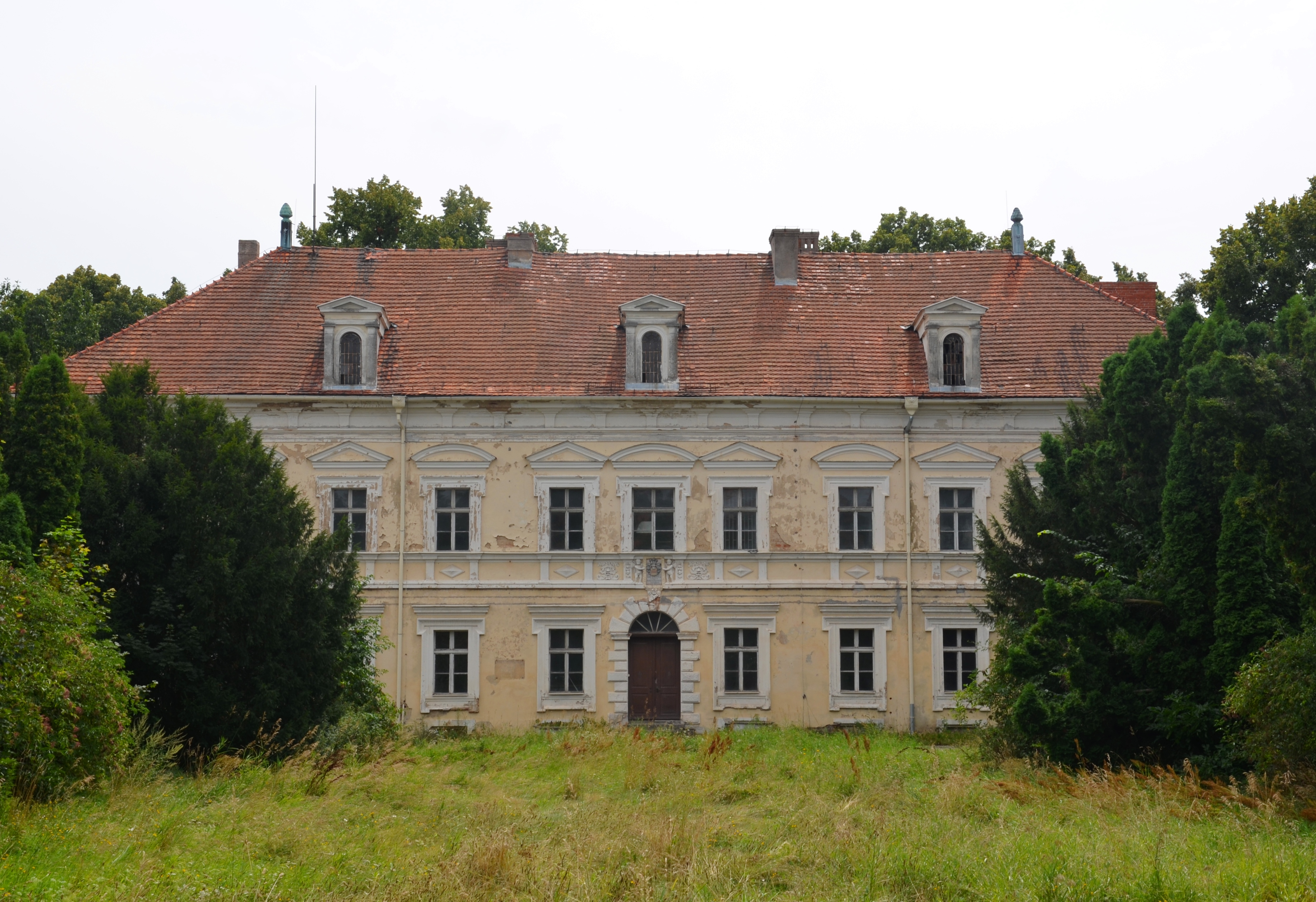
- Radomicki Palace in Konarzewo

- Location within Poland
- Coordinates: 52°20′N 16°43′E
- Country: Poland
- Voivodeship: Greater Poland
- County: Poznań
- Gmina: Dopiewo
- Population: 1,433
- Time zone: UTC+1 (CET)
  - Summer (DST): UTC+2 (CEST)
- Vehicle registration: PZ, POZ
- Primary airport: Poznań–Ławica Airport

Konarzewo [kɔnaˈʐɛvɔ] is a village in the administrative district of Gmina Dopiewo, within Poznań County, Greater Poland Voivodeship, in west-central Poland.

== History ==
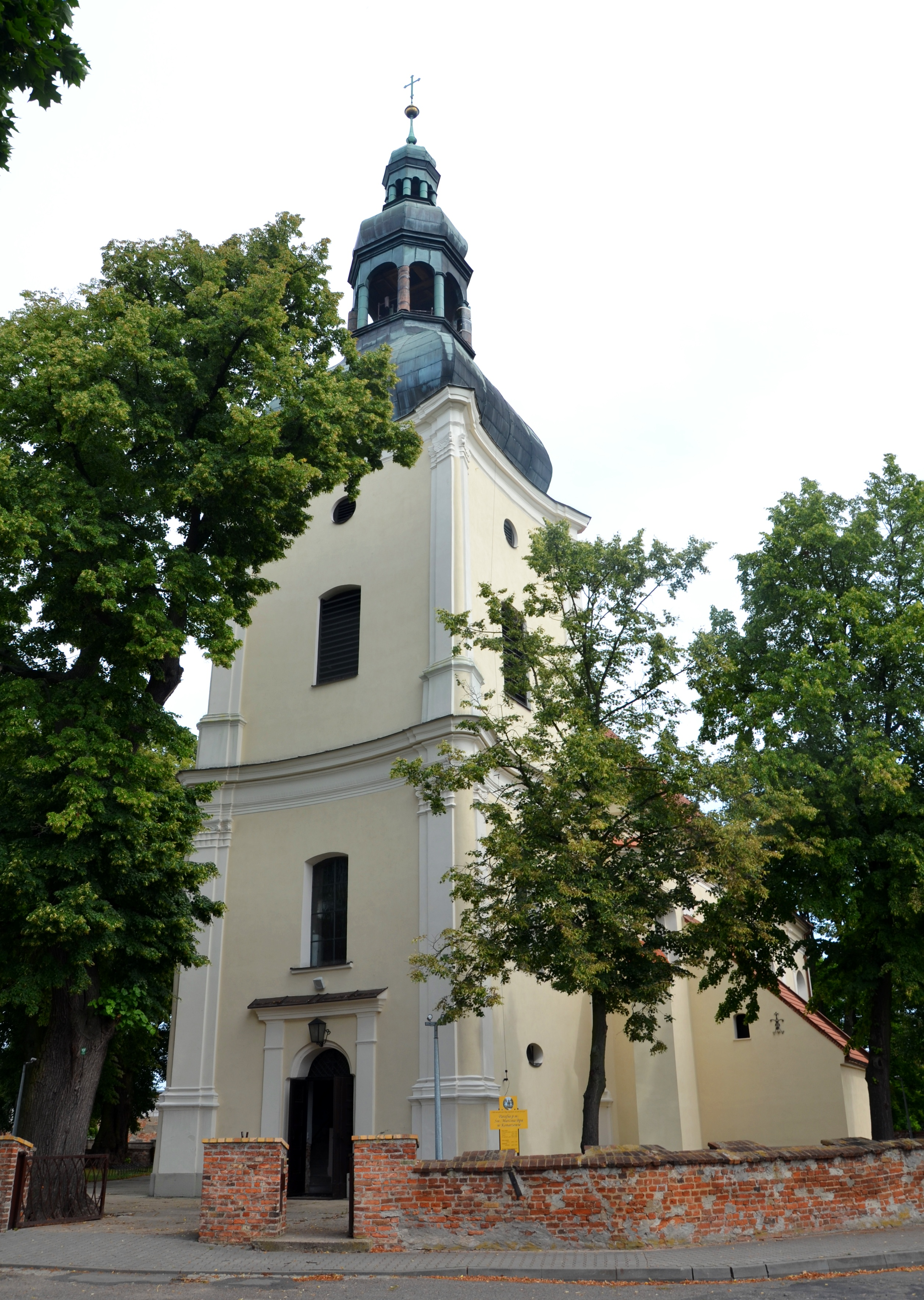
Gothic-Baroque Saint Martin church

Przeworsk culture settlements existed in Wielkopolska (Konarzewo) as late as 7th century and thus there was no time gap between this culture and Sukow-Dziedzice culture.

Konarzewo was a private village of Polish nobility, administratively located in the Poznań County in the Poznań Voivodeship in the Greater Poland Province of the Polish Crown. In the 17th century, Andrzej Aleksander Radomicki of the Kotwicz coat of arms erected a Baroque palace in Konarzewo. He also rebuilt the late Gothic Saint Martin church, which is preserved in Gothic-Baroque style since.

It was annexed by Prussia in the Second Partition of Poland in 1793. In 1807, it was included in the short-lived Polish Duchy of Warsaw, and after the duchy's dissolution it was re-annexed by Prussia in 1815. During the Polish Greater Poland uprising and European Spring of Nations, Polish lawyer and notable insurgent Jakub Krotowski-Krauthofer was captured in the village by the Prussians in May 1848. Afterwards he was imprisoned and brutally treated, before being released in 1849 by amnesty. Poland eventually regained independence after World War II in 1918, and Konarzewo was then reintegrated with Poland. In the interbellum it administratively belonged to the Poznań Voivodeship.

== Sports ==
The local football club is Orkan Konarzewo. It competes in the lower leagues.

== Notable people ==
- Stanisław Wolnowski (1893–1940), Polish military officer, recipient of the Silver Cross of the Virtuti Militari, murdered by the Russians in the Katyn massacre
