= Wójtowizna, Elbląg County =

Wójtowizna
- Settlement
- Location within Poland
- Coordinates: 53°59′51″N 19°43′24″E
- Country: Poland
- Voivodeship: Warmian-Masurian
- County: Elbląg
- Gmina: Pasłęk

Wójtowizna [vui̯tɔˈvizna] is a settlement (part of locality) of Zielonka Pasłęcka in the administrative district of Gmina Pasłęk, within Elbląg County, Warmian-Masurian Voivodeship, in northern Poland.
