= Steininger =

Steininger is a surname. Notable people with the surname include:

- Eva Steininger-Bludau (1951–2022), German politician
- Jeffree Star (Jeffrey Steininger; born 1985), American internet personality
- Daniel Steininger (born 1995), German footballer
- Ferdinand Steininger (1882–1959), German printmaker
- Franz-Josef Steininger (born 1960), German footballer
- Michel Steininger (born 1935), Swiss fencer
- Rolf Steininger (born 1942), German historian
