= Bady (disambiguation) =

Bądy is a village in northern Poland.

Bady may also refer to:

== Places ==
- Bady Bassitt, a municipality in the state of São Paulo, Brazil

== People ==
- Bady (footballer), real name Renato Escobar Baruffi (born 1989), Brazilian footballer
- Bady Minck, Luxembourgish filmmaker, film producer and artist
- Berthe Bady (1872–1921), French actress of Belgian origin
- Percy Bady, American singer, keyboardist, arranger, producer and composer

== See also ==
- Badi (disambiguation)
