= Krasin =

Krasin or Krassin may refer to:

- Krassin (1916 icebreaker), Imperial Russian icebreaker, launched as the Svyatogor
- Krasin (1976 icebreaker), Russian (formerly Soviet) icebreaker, the second Krasin, launched 1976
- Krasin Nunataks, a group of nunataks, in the Nye Mountains, Enderby Land, named after the first icebreaker Krasin
- Krasin, Warmian-Masurian Voivodeship, a village in northern Poland
- Krasin (surname)
