= Kielminek =

- Colony
- Location within Poland
- Coordinates: 54°0′37″N 19°42′28″E
- Country: Poland
- Voivodeship: Warmian-Masurian
- County: Elbląg
- Gmina: Pasłęk

Kielminek ([kʲɛlˈminɛk]) is a settlement (colony) of Zielonka Pasłęcka in the administrative district of Gmina Pasłęk, within Elbląg County, Warmian-Masurian Voivodeship, in northern Poland.
