= Elbląg (disambiguation) =

Elbląg is a city in Poland.

Elbląg may also refer to:

- Elbląg County, unit of territorial administration in Warmian-Masurian Voivodeship
- Elbląg (river), river in Poland
- Elbląg Canal, canal in Poland
- Elbląg Voivodeship, unit of administrative division
- Elbląg (parliamentary constituency), parliamentary constituency
- Elbląg Upland Landscape Park, protected area
- Gmina Elbląg, administrative district in Elbląg County
