= Bludau =

Bludau is a German surname. It is a toponymic surname derived from the place name Bludow, which is the German name of two settlements in former East Prussia, one of which is Błudowo in Poland today.

Notable people with the surname include:

- Augustinus Bludau (1862–1930), Prussian Catholic bishop
- Eva Steininger-Bludau (1951–2022), German politician
- Rita Bludau (born 1942), German rower
