= Zwierzeńskie Pole =

- Village
- Location within Poland
- Coordinates: 54°03′23″N 19°21′25″E
- Country: Poland
- Voivodeship: Warmian-Masurian
- County: Elbląg
- Gmina: Markusy
- Population: 140

Zwierzeńskie Pole [zvjɛˈʐɛɲskʲɛ ˈpɔlɛ] is a village in the administrative district of Gmina Markusy, within Elbląg County, Warmian-Masurian Voivodeship, in northern Poland.
