= Siódmak =

Siódmak is a Polish surname. Notable people include:

- Curt Siodmak, novelist and screenwriter, brother of Robert
- Robert Siodmak (1900–1973), German-born American film director

== Places ==
- Siódmak, Elbląg County, a village in northern Poland
- Siódmak, Szczytno County, another village in northern Poland
