= Sokolnik, Warmian-Masurian Voivodeship =

Sokolnik
- Farm
- Location within Poland
- Coordinates: 54°12′N 19°39′E
- Country: Poland
- Voivodeship: Warmian-Masurian
- County: Elbląg
- Gmina: Młynary
- Population: 3

Sokolnik [sɔˈkɔlnik] is a farm in the administrative district of Gmina Młynary, within Elbląg County, Warmian-Masurian Voivodeship, in northern Poland. The farm has a population of 3.
