= Kajmy =

- Settlement
- Location within Poland
- Coordinates: 54°5′19″N 19°43′19″E
- Country: Poland
- Voivodeship: Warmian-Masurian
- County: Elbląg
- Gmina: Pasłęk
- Population: 10

Kajmy [ˈkai̯mɨ] is a settlement in the administrative district of Gmina Pasłęk, within Elbląg County, Warmian-Masurian Voivodeship, in northern Poland.
