= Broniszewo, Warmian-Masurian Voivodeship =

Broniszewo
- Village
- Location within Poland
- Coordinates: 54°10′23″N 19°46′50″E
- Country: Poland
- Voivodeship: Warmian-Masurian
- County: Elbląg
- Gmina: Młynary
- Population: 20

Broniszewo [brɔniˈʂɛvɔ] is a village in the administrative district of Gmina Młynary, within Elbląg County, Warmian-Masurian Voivodeship, in northern Poland.
