= Kraskowo, Elbląg County =

Kraskowo
- Village
- Location within Poland
- Coordinates: 54°14′N 19°45′E
- Country: Poland
- Voivodeship: Warmian-Masurian
- County: Elbląg
- Gmina: Młynary

Kraskowo [krasˈkɔvɔ] is a village in the administrative district of Gmina Młynary, within Elbląg County, Warmian-Masurian Voivodeship, in northern Poland.
