= Stalewo =

- Village
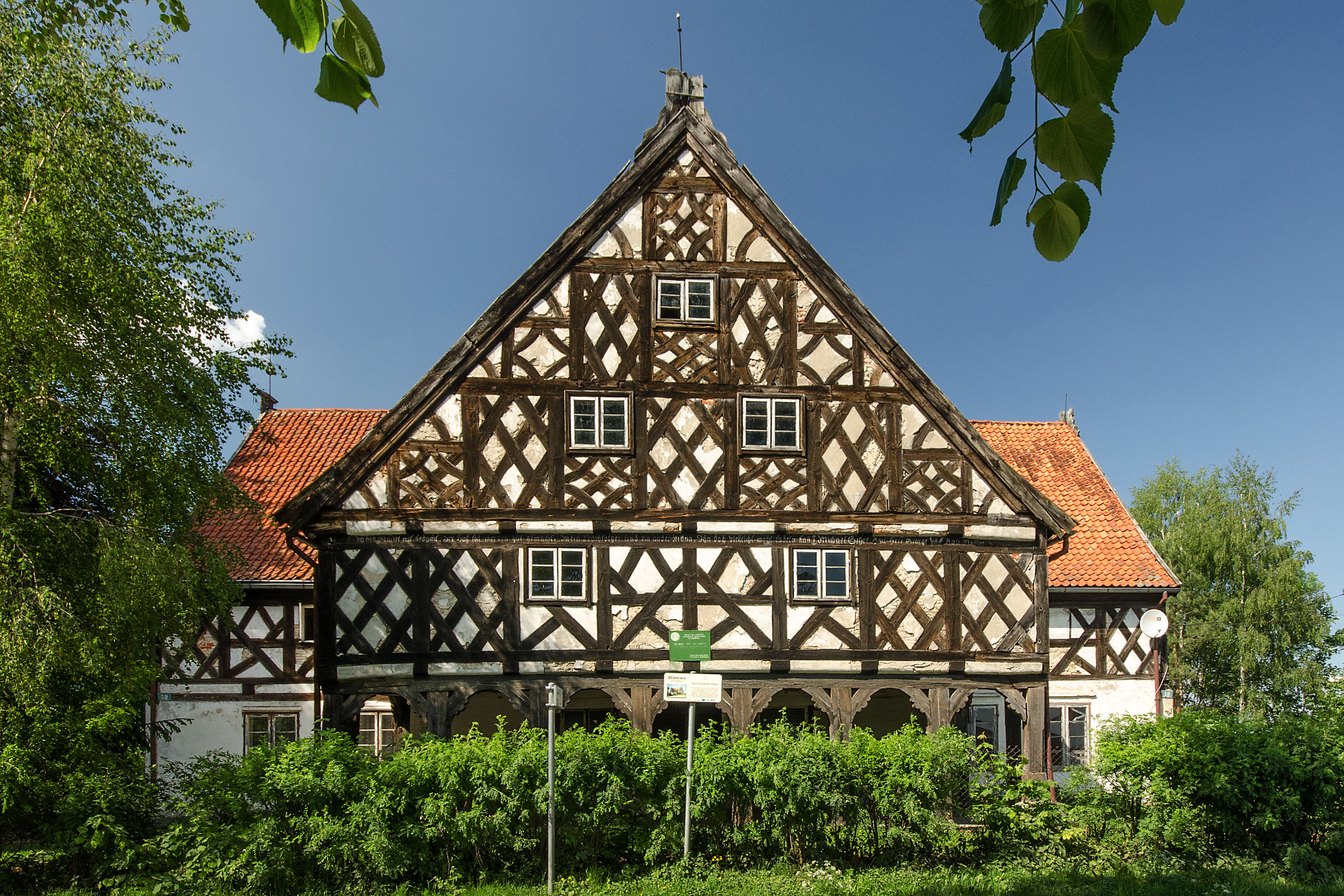
- Mennonite timberframe house

- Location within Poland
- Coordinates: 54°1′32″N 19°16′20″E
- Country: Poland
- Voivodeship: Warmian-Masurian
- County: Elbląg
- Gmina: Markusy
- Population: 178
- Time zone: UTC+1 (CET)
  - Summer (DST): UTC+2 (CEST)
- Vehicle registration: NEB
- Website: stalewo.blog.onet.pl

Stalewo [staˈlɛvɔ] is a village in the administrative district of Gmina Markusy, within Elbląg County, Warmian-Masurian Voivodeship, in northern Poland.

Stalewo was part of Poland, administratively located in the Malbork Voivodeship, before its annexation by Prussia in the First Partition of Poland in 1772. Afterwards from 1871 to 1945, it was also part of Germany. Following Nazi Germany's defeat in World War II, the village was restored to Poland.
