= Sapy =

Sapy may refer to the following places in Poland:

- Sapy, Łódź Voivodeship
- Sapy, Masovian Voivodeship
- Sąpy, Elbląg County, Warmian-Masurian Voivodeship
- Sąpy, Iława County, Warmian-Masurian Voivodeship
