= Rucianka =

- Village
- Location within Poland
- Coordinates: 54°15′52″N 19°43′36″E
- Country: Poland
- Voivodeship: Warmian-Masurian
- County: Elbląg
- Gmina: Młynary

Rucianka [ruˈt͡ɕanka] is a village in the administrative district of Gmina Młynary, within Elbląg County, Warmian-Masurian Voivodeship, in northern Poland.

Before 1772 the area was part of Kingdom of Poland, and in 1772–1945 it belonged to Prussia and Germany (East Prussia).
