= Gwiździny =

Gwiździny may refer to:

- Gwiździny, Elbląg County, Poland
- Gwiździny, Nowe Miasto County, Poland
