= Majewo, Warmian-Masurian Voivodeship =

Majewo
- Village
- Location within Poland
- Coordinates: 54°13′6″N 19°35′1″E
- Country: Poland
- Voivodeship: Warmian-Masurian
- County: Elbląg
- Gmina: Milejewo
- Population: 280
- Website: https://web.archive.org/web/20111006163011/http://www.majewo2005.webpark.pl/

Majewo [maˈjɛvɔ] is a village in the administrative district of Gmina Milejewo, within Elbląg County, Warmian-Masurian Voivodeship, in northern Poland.

Before 1772 the area was part of Kingdom of Poland, and in 1772–1945 it belonged to Prussia and Germany (East Prussia).
