= Kupin =

Kupin may refer to:

== Places ==
- Kupin, Elbląg County, village in northern Poland
- Kupin, Iława County in Warmian-Masurian Voivodeship (north Poland)
- Kupyn, village in Ukraine

== Medicine ==
- KUPIN, a mnemonic for causes of high anion gap metabolic acidosis
