= Burdajny =

- Village
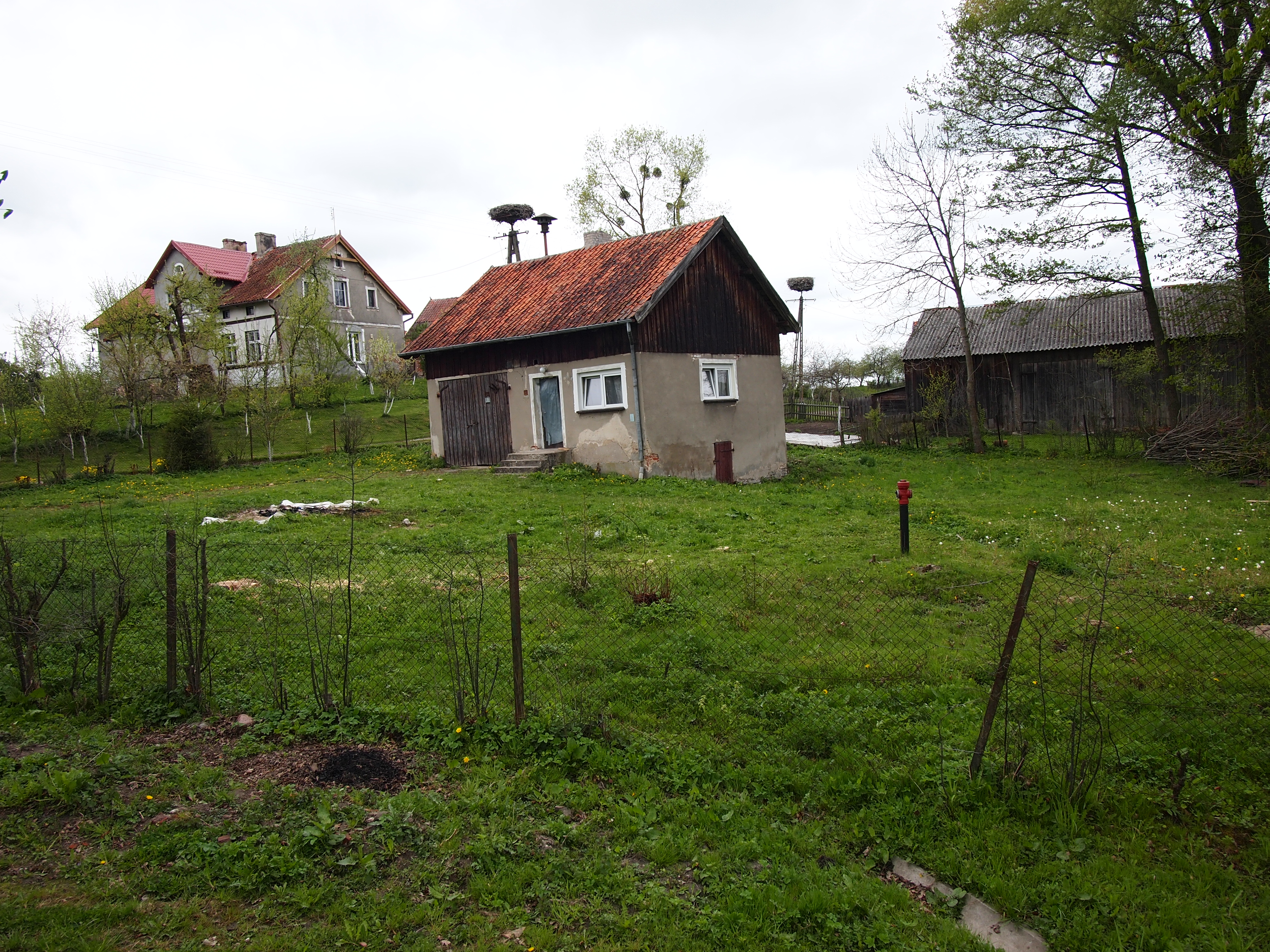

- Location within Poland
- Coordinates: 54°5′10″N 19°52′21″E
- Country: Poland
- Voivodeship: Warmian-Masurian
- County: Elbląg
- Gmina: Godkowo

Burdajny [burˈdai̯nɨ] is a village in the administrative district of Gmina Godkowo, within Elbląg County, Warmian-Masurian Voivodeship, in northern Poland.
