= Sakówko =

- Village
- Location within Poland
- Coordinates: 54°3′2″N 19°37′35″E
- Country: Poland
- Voivodeship: Warmian-Masurian
- County: Elbląg
- Gmina: Pasłęk
- Population: 160

Sakówko [saˈkufkɔ] is a village in the administrative district of Gmina Pasłęk, within Elbląg County, Warmian-Masurian Voivodeship, in northern Poland.
