= Łączna =

Łączna may refer to the following places in Poland:

- Łączna, Kłodzko County in Lower Silesian Voivodeship (south-west Poland)
- Łączna, Wałbrzych County in Lower Silesian Voivodeship (south-west Poland)
- Łączna, Świętokrzyskie Voivodeship (south-central Poland)
- Łączna, Warmian-Masurian Voivodeship (north Poland)
