= Pochylnia Oleśnica =

- Settlement
- Location within Poland
- Coordinates: 54°1′0″N 19°35′55″E
- Country: Poland
- Voivodeship: Warmian-Masurian
- County: Elbląg
- Gmina: Pasłęk

Pochylnia Oleśnica [pɔˈxɨlɲa ɔlɛɕˈnit͡sa] is a settlement in the administrative district of Gmina Pasłęk, within Elbląg County, Warmian-Masurian Voivodeship, in northern Poland.
