= Piniewo =

- Village
- Location within Poland
- Coordinates: 53°57′N 19°41′E
- Country: Poland
- Voivodeship: Warmian-Masurian
- County: Elbląg
- Gmina: Pasłęk
- Population: 100

Piniewo [piˈɲɛvɔ] is a village in the administrative district of Gmina Pasłęk, within Elbląg County, Warmian-Masurian Voivodeship, in northern Poland.
