= Złotnica, Warmian-Masurian Voivodeship =

Złotnica
- Village
- Location within Poland
- Coordinates: 54°3′N 19°19′E
- Country: Poland
- Voivodeship: Warmian-Masurian
- County: Elbląg
- Gmina: Markusy
- Population: 110

Złotnica [zwɔtˈnit͡sa] is a village in the administrative district of Gmina Markusy, within Elbląg County, Warmian-Masurian Voivodeship, in northern Poland.
