= Kąty, Elbląg County =

Kąty
- Settlement
- Location within Poland
- Coordinates: 53°59′N 19°37′E
- Country: Poland
- Voivodeship: Warmian-Masurian
- County: Elbląg
- Gmina: Pasłęk

Kąty [ˈkɔntɨ] (German: Kanthen) is a settlement in the administrative district of Gmina Pasłęk, within Elbląg County, Warmian-Masurian Voivodeship, in northern Poland.
