= Kudyński Bór =

- Village
- Location within Poland
- Coordinates: 53°59′6″N 19°44′36″E
- Country: Poland
- Voivodeship: Warmian-Masurian
- County: Elbląg
- Gmina: Pasłęk

Kudyński Bór (Polish: [kuˈdɨj̃skʲi ˈbur]) is a village in the administrative district of Gmina Pasłęk, within Elbląg County, Warmian-Masurian Voivodeship, in northern Poland.
