= Kamiennik Wielki =

- Village
- Location within Poland
- Coordinates: 54°11′3″N 19°32′40″E
- Country: Poland
- Voivodeship: Warmian-Masurian
- County: Elbląg
- Gmina: Milejewo
- Population: 570

Kamiennik Wielki (Polish pronunciation: [kaˈmjɛɲːik ˈfjɛlkʲi]) is a village in the administrative district of Gmina Milejewo, within Elbląg County, Warmian-Masurian Voivodeship, in northern Poland.

== Demographics ==
=== Population ===
The village population has been steadily increasing over time.

Historical population
Year	Pop.	±%
1820	300	—
1875	435	+45.0%
1894	550	+26.4%
1925	533	−3.1%
1998	546	+2.4%
2011	558	+2.2%

=== Gender structure (2011) ===
- Female: 49.1%
- Male: 50.9%

=== Age structure (2011) ===
- Pre-working age: 21.0%
- Working age: 69.0%
- After working age: 10.0%
