= Pochylnia Nowy Całun =

- Settlement
- Location within Poland
- Coordinates: 54°2′40″N 19°33′44″E
- Country: Poland
- Voivodeship: Warmian-Masurian
- County: Elbląg
- Gmina: Pasłęk

Pochylnia Nowy Całun [pɔˈxɨlɲa ˈnɔvɨ ˈt͡sawun] is a settlement in the administrative district of Gmina Pasłęk, within Elbląg County, Warmian-Masurian Voivodeship, in northern Poland.
