= Zajączkowo, Elbląg County =

Zajączkowo
- Village
- Location within Poland
- Coordinates: 54°14′6″N 19°33′43″E
- Country: Poland
- Voivodeship: Warmian-Masurian
- County: Elbląg
- Gmina: Milejewo
- Population: 130

Zajączkowo [zajɔnt͡ʂˈkɔvɔ] is a village in the administrative district of Gmina Milejewo, within Elbląg County, Warmian-Masurian Voivodeship, in northern Poland.

Before 1772 the area was part of the Kingdom of Poland; from 1772 to 1945, Prussia and Germany (East Prussia).
