= Majki, Warmian-Masurian Voivodeship =

Majki
- Village
- Location within Poland
- Coordinates: 54°01′24″N 19°41′49″E
- Country: Poland
- Voivodeship: Warmian-Masurian
- County: Elbląg
- Gmina: Pasłęk

Majki [ˈmai̯ki] is a village in the administrative district of Gmina Pasłęk, within Elbląg County, Warmian-Masurian Voivodeship, in northern Poland.

== Notable residents ==
- Emil Roßmann (1920–2003), Wehrmacht officer
