= Stankowo, Elbląg County =

Stankowo
- Village
- Location within Poland
- Coordinates: 54°1′19″N 19°28′29″E
- Country: Poland
- Voivodeship: Warmian-Masurian
- County: Elbląg
- Gmina: Markusy
- Population: 140

Stankowo [stanˈkɔvɔ] is a village in the administrative district of Gmina Markusy, within Elbląg County, Warmian-Masurian Voivodeship, in northern Poland.
