= Rogowo, Elbląg County =

Rogowo
- Village
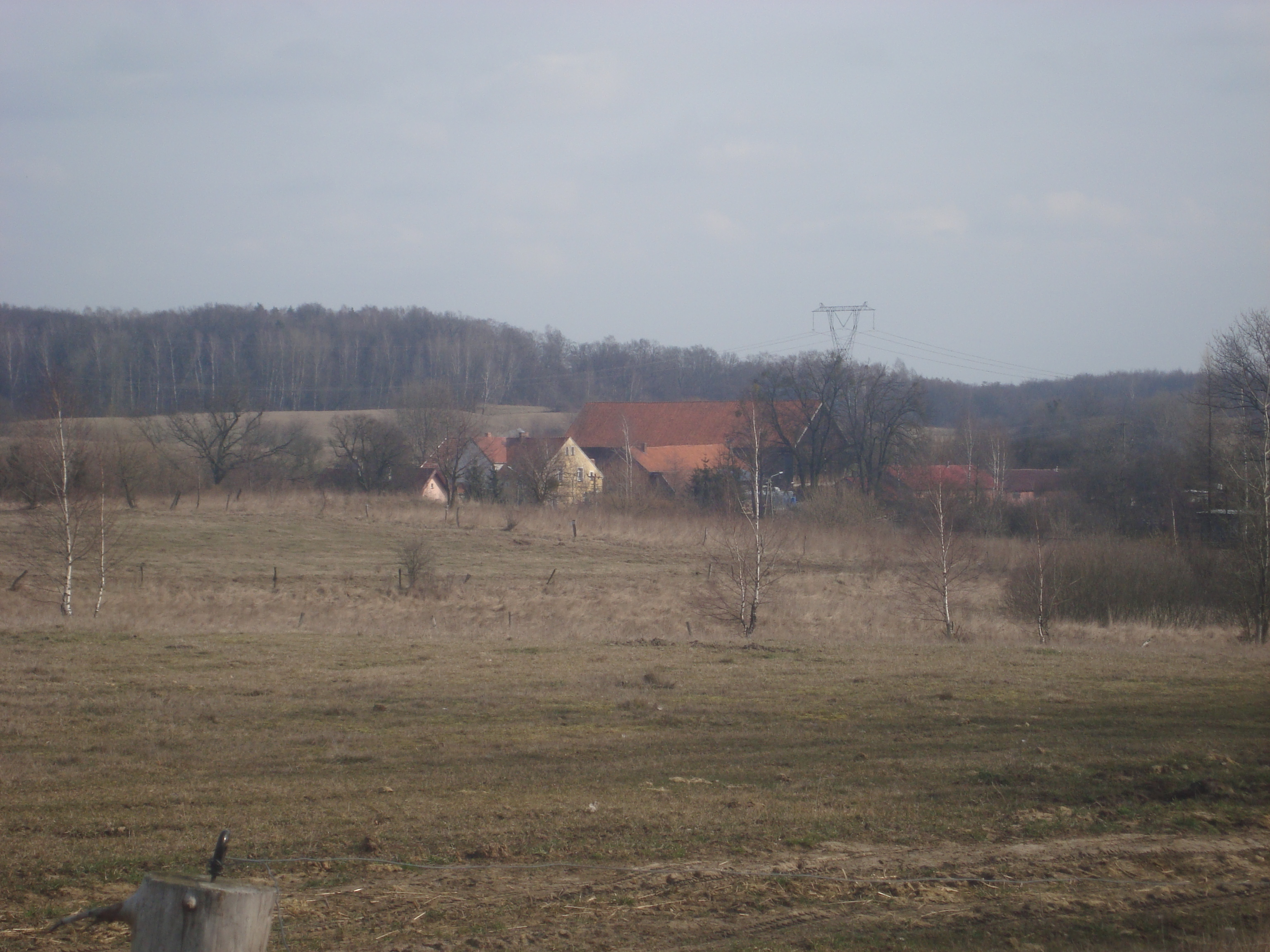

- Location within Poland
- Coordinates: 54°9′N 19°35′E
- Country: Poland
- Voivodeship: Warmian-Masurian
- County: Elbląg
- Gmina: Pasłęk
- Population: 50

Rogowo [rɔˈɡɔvɔ] is a village in the administrative district of Gmina Pasłęk, within Elbląg County, Warmian-Masurian Voivodeship, in northern Poland.
