= Pomorska Wieś =

- Village
- Location within Poland
- Coordinates: 54°9′16″N 19°34′14″E
- Country: Poland
- Voivodeship: Warmian-Masurian
- County: Elbląg
- Gmina: Milejewo
- Population: 280

Pomorska Wieś [pɔˈmɔrska ˈvjɛɕ] is a village in the administrative district of Gmina Milejewo, within Elbląg County, Warmian-Masurian Voivodeship, in northern Poland.
