= Krosno, Elbląg County =

Krosno
- Village
- Location within Poland
- Coordinates: 54°3′51″N 19°36′15″E
- Country: Poland
- Voivodeship: Warmian-Masurian
- County: Elbląg
- Gmina: Pasłęk

Krosno [ˈkrɔsnɔ] is a village in the administrative district of Gmina Pasłęk, within Elbląg County, Warmian-Masurian Voivodeship, in northern Poland.
