= Leżnice =

- Village
- Location within Poland
- Coordinates: 54°3′56″N 19°44′32″E
- Country: Poland
- Voivodeship: Warmian-Masurian
- County: Elbląg
- Gmina: Pasłęk

Leżnice [lɛʐˈnit͡sɛ] is a village in the administrative district of Gmina Pasłęk, within Elbląg County, Warmian-Masurian Voivodeship, in northern Poland.
