= Drulity =

- Village
- Location within Poland
- Coordinates: 53°58′15″N 19°38′19″E
- Country: Poland
- Voivodeship: Warmian-Masurian
- County: Elbląg
- Gmina: Pasłęk
- Population: 410

Drulity [druˈlitɨ] is a village in the administrative district of Gmina Pasłęk, within Elbląg County, Warmian-Masurian Voivodeship, in northern Poland.
