= Rakowo, Warmian-Masurian Voivodeship =

Rakowo
- Village
- Location within Poland
- Coordinates: 54°14′3″N 19°30′29″E
- Country: Poland
- Voivodeship: Warmian-Masurian
- County: Elbląg
- Gmina: Milejewo

Rakowo [raˈkɔvɔ] is a village in the administrative district of Gmina Milejewo, within Elbląg County, Warmian-Masurian Voivodeship, in northern Poland.
