= Surowe, Warmian-Masurian Voivodeship =

Surowe
- Village
- Location within Poland
- Coordinates: 54°2′N 19°46′E
- Country: Poland
- Voivodeship: Warmian-Masurian
- County: Elbląg
- Gmina: Pasłęk

Surowe [suˈrɔvɛ] is a village in the administrative district of Gmina Pasłęk, within Elbląg County, Warmian-Masurian Voivodeship, in northern Poland.
