= Rzędy =

- Village
- Location within Poland
- Coordinates: 54°02′54″N 19°41′28″E
- Country: Poland
- Voivodeship: Warmian-Masurian
- County: Elbląg
- Gmina: Pasłęk
- Population: 1,028

Rzędy [ˈʐɛndɨ] is a village in the administrative district of Gmina Pasłęk, within Elbląg County, Warmian-Masurian Voivodeship, in northern Poland.
