= Romanowo, Elbląg County =

Romanowo
- Settlement
- Location within Poland
- Coordinates: 54°10′54″N 19°31′25″E
- Country: Poland
- Voivodeship: Warmian-Masurian
- County: Elbląg
- Gmina: Milejewo

Romanowo [rɔmaˈnɔvɔ] is a settlement in the administrative district of Gmina Milejewo, within Elbląg County, Warmian-Masurian Voivodeship, in northern Poland.
