= Krzewsk =

- Village
- Location within Poland
- Coordinates: 54°3′19″N 19°25′30″E
- Country: Poland
- Voivodeship: Warmian-Masurian
- County: Elbląg
- Gmina: Markusy
- Population: 422

Krzewsk [kʂɛfsk] is a village in the administrative district of Gmina Markusy, within Elbląg County, Warmian-Masurian Voivodeship, in northern Poland.
