= Zielonka Pasłęcka =

- Village
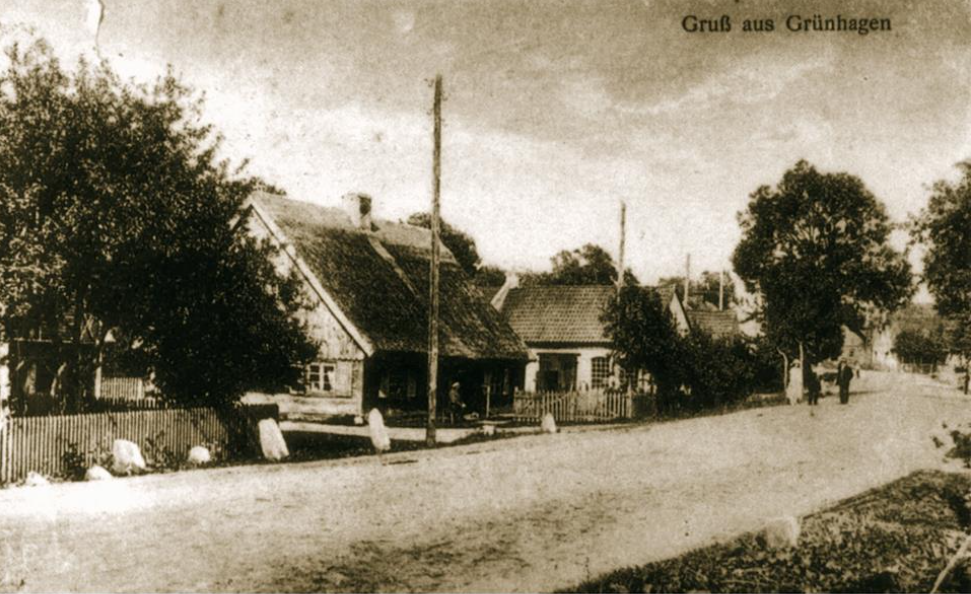
- The village before World War II.

- Location within Poland
- Coordinates: 53°59′43″N 19°41′55″E
- Country: Poland
- Voivodeship: Warmian-Masurian
- County: Elbląg
- Gmina: Pasłęk
- Population: 606

Zielonka Pasłęcka [ʑɛˈlɔnka paˈswɛnt͡ska] (formerly known in Polish as Zielonka Pruska) is a village in the administrative district of Gmina Pasłęk, within Elbląg County, Warmian-Masurian Voivodeship, in northern Poland.

Official parts of Zielonka Pasłęcka
SIMC	Name	Type
0154810	Wójtowizna	Part of locality

== Railroad Tragedy of January 1945 ==
Near the end of World War II, on 21 and 22 January 1945 the village's train station was the site of a tragic train wreck followed by a Soviet attack on unarmed refugees. A German Army hospital train full of wounded which had stopped briefly at the station was rear-ended some time around 11 pm by a train carrying a few thousand refugees from Osterode and Mohrungen. The collision resulted in many killed and wounded on both trains. A second refugee train arrived not long afterwards, but was able to come to a stop before colliding with the first refugee train.

The collision destroyed a number of rail cars on both the hospital and the refugee trains; this permanently blocked the way for the second refugee train. The hospital train, leaving its wrecked wagons behind, was able to proceed towards the west towards Preußisch Holland and Elbing and escape. However, three to four thousand refugees were left waiting for a replacement train that never arrived.

At dawn on 22 January a Soviet Army unit consisting of tanks and infantry arrived, and, possibly due to the presence of some German soldiers in uniform, opened fired on the many people and buildings at the station, killing 140 to 150. The few German soldiers were taken prisoners, and a guard troop was set to make sure the refugees remained in place. These were removed after a week, whereupon the remaining people dispersed. The dead from both the train wreck and the Russian attack were buried in shallow graves in sites near the train station in March 1945. Today, there are two plates in memory of the tragedy, both placed on the train station building, one written in Polish and the second one written in German.
