= Wilkowo, Elbląg County =

Wilkowo
- Village
- Location within Poland
- Coordinates: 54°9′26″N 19°31′58″E
- Country: Poland
- Voivodeship: Warmian-Masurian
- County: Elbląg
- Gmina: Milejewo
- Population: 90

Wilkowo [vilˈkɔvɔ] is a village in the administrative district of Gmina Milejewo, within Elbląg County, Warmian-Masurian Voivodeship, in northern Poland.
