= Grądki, Warmian-Masurian Voivodeship =

Grądki
- Village
- Location within Poland
- Coordinates: 54°2′N 19°50′E
- Country: Poland
- Voivodeship: Warmian-Masurian
- County: Elbląg
- Gmina: Godkowo
- Population: 290

Grądki [ˈɡrɔntki] is a village in the administrative district of Gmina Godkowo, within Elbląg County, Warmian-Masurian Voivodeship, in northern Poland.
