= Stare Dolno =

- Village
- Location within Poland
- Coordinates: 54°0′2″N 19°25′11″E
- Country: Poland
- Voivodeship: Warmian-Masurian
- County: Elbląg
- Gmina: Markusy
- Population: 180
- Time zone: UTC+1 (CET)
  - Summer (DST): UTC+2 (CEST)
- Vehicle registration: NEB

Stare Dolno [ˈstarɛ ˈdɔlnɔ] is a village in the administrative district of Gmina Markusy, within Elbląg County, Warmian-Masurian Voivodeship, in northern Poland. It is situated on the Dzierzgoń River.

In October–November 1831, various Polish infantry and artillery units, engineer corps and sappers of the November Uprising stopped in the village and its environs on the way to their internment places.
