= Nowe Sadłuki, Elbląg County =

Nowe Sadłuki
- Settlement
- Location within Poland
- Coordinates: 54°15′35″N 19°42′58″E
- Country: Poland
- Voivodeship: Warmian-Masurian
- County: Elbląg
- Gmina: Młynary

Nowe Sadłuki [ˈnɔvɛ saˈdwuki] is a settlement in the administrative district of Gmina Młynary, within Elbląg County, Warmian-Masurian Voivodeship, in northern Poland.

Before 1772 the area was part of Kingdom of Poland, and in 1772–1945 it belonged to Prussia and Germany (East Prussia).
