= Majewo-Kolonia =

- Settlement
- Location within Poland
- Coordinates: 54°12′25″N 19°36′13″E
- Country: Poland
- Voivodeship: Warmian-Masurian
- County: Elbląg
- Gmina: Milejewo

Majewo-Kolonia [maˈjɛvɔ kɔˈlɔɲa] is a settlement in the administrative district of Gmina Milejewo, within Elbląg County, Warmian-Masurian Voivodeship, in northern Poland.
