= Czarna Góra, Warmian-Masurian Voivodeship =

Czarna Góra
- Settlement
- Location within Poland
- Coordinates: 53°59′46″N 19°38′11″E
- Country: Poland
- Voivodeship: Warmian-Masurian
- County: Elbląg
- Gmina: Pasłęk

Czarna Góra [ˈt͡ʂarna ˈɡura] is a settlement in the administrative district of Gmina Pasłęk, within Elbląg County, Warmian-Masurian Voivodeship, in northern Poland.
