= Tulno =

- Village
- Location within Poland
- Coordinates: 53°59′2″N 19°46′42″E
- Country: Poland
- Voivodeship: Warmian-Masurian
- County: Elbląg
- Gmina: Pasłęk

Population
  - Total: 1
- Postal code: 14-400

Tulno [ˈtulnɔ] is a village in the administrative district of Gmina Pasłęk, within Elbląg County, Warmian-Masurian Voivodeship, in northern Poland. As of 2021, only one person lives in the village.
