= Gulbity, Elbląg County =

Gulbity
- Village
- Location within Poland
- Coordinates: 54°5′46″N 19°43′11″E
- Country: Poland
- Voivodeship: Warmian-Masurian
- County: Elbląg
- Gmina: Pasłęk
- Population: 30

Gulbity [ɡulˈbitɨ] is a village in the administrative district of Gmina Pasłęk, within Elbląg County, Warmian-Masurian Voivodeship, in northern Poland.
