= Zielony Grąd =

- Village
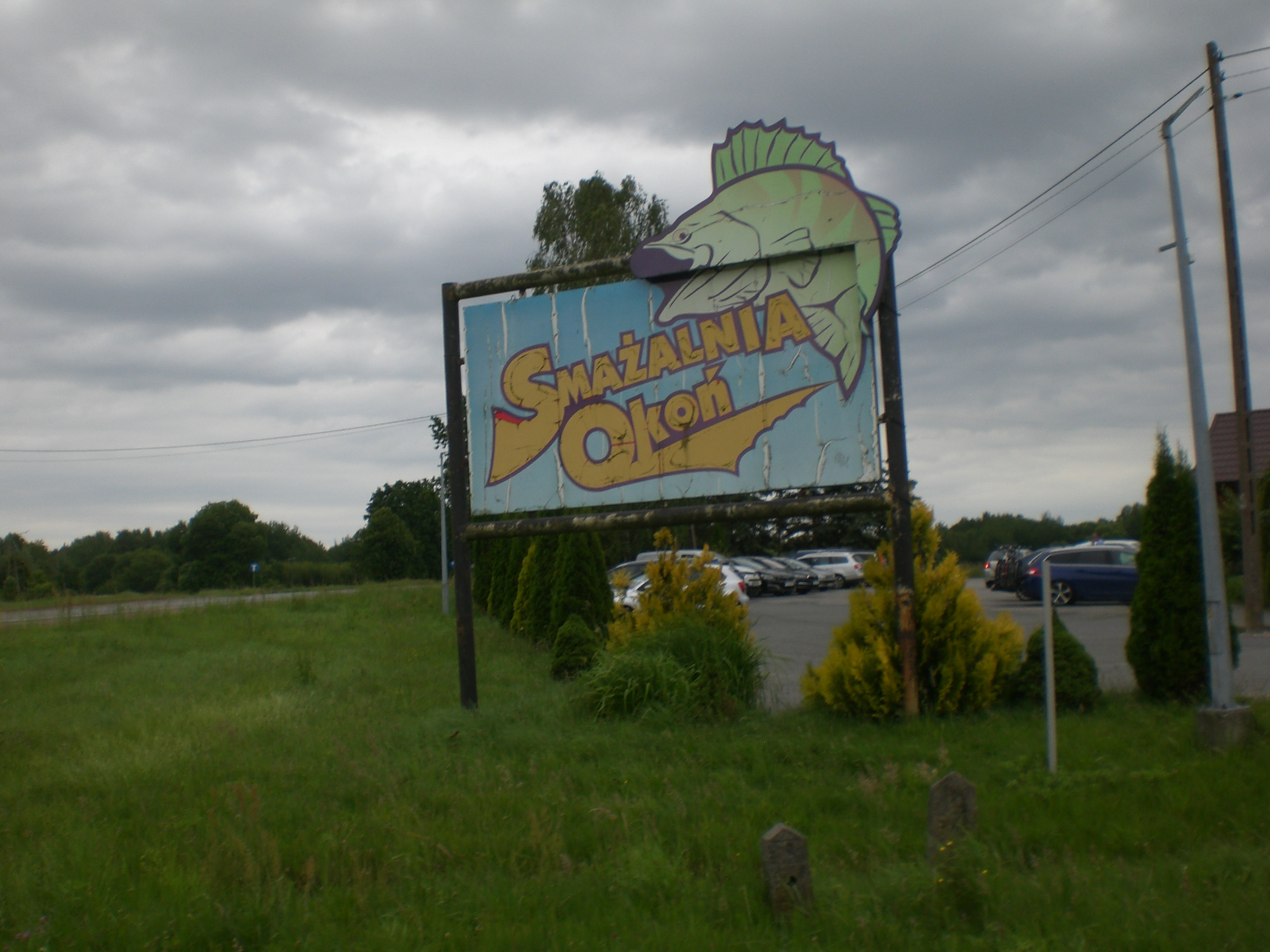
- Zielony Grąd, Smażalnia Okoń

- Location within Poland
- Coordinates: 54°5′13″N 19°36′28″E
- Country: Poland
- Voivodeship: Warmian-Masurian
- County: Elbląg
- Gmina: Pasłęk
- Population: 120

Zielony Grąd (Polish pronunciation: [ʑɛˈlɔnɨ ˈɡrɔnt]) is a village in the administrative district of Gmina Pasłęk, within Elbląg County, Warmian-Masurian Voivodeship, in northern Poland.
