= Siedlisko, Elbląg County =

Siedlisko
- Village
- Location within Poland
- Coordinates: 54°3′49″N 19°50′0″E
- Country: Poland
- Voivodeship: Warmian-Masurian
- County: Elbląg
- Gmina: Godkowo
- Population: 10

Siedlisko [ɕɛˈdliskɔ] is a village in the administrative district of Gmina Godkowo, within Elbląg County, Warmian-Masurian Voivodeship, in northern Poland.
