= Nowe Monasterzysko =

- Village
- Location within Poland
- Coordinates: 54°12′39″N 19°37′08″E
- Country: Poland
- Voivodeship: Warmian-Masurian
- County: Elbląg
- Gmina: Młynary

Nowe Monasterzysko [ˈnɔvɛ mɔnastɛˈʐɨskɔ] is a village in the administrative district of Gmina Młynary, within Elbląg County, Warmian-Masurian Voivodeship, in northern Poland.
