= Bielica, Warmian-Masurian Voivodeship =

Village in Poland

Bielica
- Village
- Location within Poland
- Coordinates: 54°5′N 19°47′E
- Country: Poland
- Voivodeship: Warmian-Masurian
- County: Elbląg
- Gmina: Godkowo

Bielica [bjɛˈlit͡sa] is a village in the administrative district of Gmina Godkowo, within Elbląg County, Warmian-Masurian Voivodeship, in northern Poland.
