= Krykajny =

- Village
- Location within Poland
- Coordinates: 54°5′N 19°59′E
- Country: Poland
- Voivodeship: Warmian-Masurian
- County: Elbląg
- Gmina: Godkowo
- Population (2021): 49

Krykajny [krɨˈkai̯nɨ] is a village in the administrative district of Gmina Godkowo, within Elbląg County, Warmian-Masurian Voivodeship, in northern Poland. It has a population of 49 (as of 31 March 2021).
