= Olkowo =

- Village
- Location within Poland
- Coordinates: 54°7′N 20°2′E
- Country: Poland
- Voivodeship: Warmian-Masurian
- County: Elbląg
- Gmina: Godkowo

Olkowo [ɔlˈkɔvɔ] is a village in the administrative district of Gmina Godkowo, within Elbląg County, Warmian-Masurian Voivodeship, in northern Poland.
