= Rogajny, Elbląg County =

Rogajny
- Village
- Location within Poland
- Coordinates: 54°2′48″N 19°43′43″E
- Country: Poland
- Voivodeship: Warmian-Masurian
- County: Elbląg
- Gmina: Pasłęk
- Population: 403

Rogajny [rɔˈɡai̯nɨ] is a village in the administrative district of Gmina Pasłęk, within Elbląg County, Warmian-Masurian Voivodeship, in northern Poland.
