= Zielno =

- Village
- Location within Poland
- Coordinates: 54°00′13″N 19°47′02″E
- Country: Poland
- Voivodeship: Warmian-Masurian
- County: Elbląg
- Gmina: Pasłęk

Zielno [ˈʑɛlnɔ] is a village in the administrative district of Gmina Pasłęk, within Elbląg County, Warmian-Masurian Voivodeship, in northern Poland.
