= Stoboje =

- Village
- Location within Poland
- Coordinates: 54°10′50″N 19°30′37″E
- Country: Poland
- Voivodeship: Warmian-Masurian
- County: Elbląg
- Gmina: Milejewo
- Population: 200

Stoboje [stɔˈbɔjɛ] is a village in the administrative district of Gmina Milejewo, within Elbląg County, Warmian-Masurian Voivodeship, in northern Poland.
