= Piastowo, Warmian-Masurian Voivodeship =

Piastowo
- Village
- Location within Poland
- Coordinates: 54°12′35″N 19°30′30″E
- Country: Poland
- Voivodeship: Warmian-Masurian
- County: Elbląg
- Gmina: Milejewo
- Population: 90
- Time zone: UTC+1 (CET)
  - Summer (DST): UTC+2 (CEST)
- Vehicle registration: NEB

Piastowo [pjasˈtɔvɔ] is a village in the administrative district of Gmina Milejewo, within Elbląg County, Warmian-Masurian Voivodeship, in northern Poland.

== History ==
The village was part of the Kingdom of Poland until the First Partition of Poland in 1772, when it was annexed by Prussia. In 1871 it became part of Germany, within which it was administratively part of the province of East Prussia. During World War II, in 1944–1945, it was the location of a subcamp of the Stutthof concentration camp, in which the German Organisation Todt imprisoned over 5,000 women as forced labour. Following Germany's defeat in World War II, in 1945, the village was reintegrated with Poland.
