= Mikołajki, Elbląg County =

Mikołajki
- Village
- Location within Poland
- Coordinates: 54°9′5″N 19°44′45″E
- Country: Poland
- Voivodeship: Warmian-Masurian
- County: Elbląg
- Gmina: Młynary
- Population: 30

Mikołajki [mikɔˈwai̯ki] is a village in the administrative district of Gmina Młynary, within Elbląg County, Warmian-Masurian Voivodeship, in northern Poland.
