= Bronikowo, Warmian-Masurian Voivodeship =

Bronikowo
- Village
- Location within Poland
- Coordinates: 54°10′29″N 19°44′44″E
- Country: Poland
- Voivodeship: Warmian-Masurian
- County: Elbląg
- Gmina: Młynary
- Population: 50

Bronikowo [brɔniˈkɔvɔ] is a village in the administrative district of Gmina Młynary, within Elbląg County, Warmian-Masurian Voivodeship, in northern Poland.
