= Stodolniki =

- Settlement
- Location within Poland
- Coordinates: 54°14′59″N 19°36′37″E
- Country: Poland
- Voivodeship: Warmian-Masurian
- County: Elbląg
- Gmina: Milejewo

Stodolniki [stɔdɔlˈniki] is a settlement in the administrative district of Gmina Milejewo, within Elbląg County, Warmian-Masurian Voivodeship, in northern Poland.
