= Owczarnia =

Owczarnia may refer to the following places:

- Owczarnia, Kraśnik County in Lublin Voivodeship (east Poland)
- Owczarnia, Gmina Józefów nad Wisłą in Opole County, Lublin Voivodeship (east Poland)
- Owczarnia, Masovian Voivodeship (east-central Poland)
- Owczarnia, Elbląg County in Warmian-Masurian Voivodeship (north Poland)
- Owczarnia, Iława County in Warmian-Masurian Voivodeship (north Poland)
- Owczarnia, Kętrzyn County in Warmian-Masurian Voivodeship (north Poland)
- Owczarnia, Olsztyn County in Warmian-Masurian Voivodeship (north Poland)
- Owczarnia, West Pomeranian Voivodeship (north-west Poland)
