= Janiki Pasłęckie =

- Village
- Location within Poland
- Coordinates: 54°10′N 19°46′E
- Country: Poland
- Voivodeship: Warmian-Masurian
- County: Elbląg
- Gmina: Młynary

Janiki Pasłęckie [jaˈniki paˈswɛnt͡skʲɛ] is a village in the administrative district of Gmina Młynary, within Elbląg County, Warmian-Masurian Voivodeship, in northern Poland.
