= Jezioro, Warmian-Masurian Voivodeship =

Jezioro
- Village
- Location within Poland
- Coordinates: 54°4′27″N 19°23′10″E
- Country: Poland
- Voivodeship: Warmian-Masurian
- County: Elbląg
- Gmina: Markusy
- Population: 160

Jezioro [jɛˈʑɔrɔ] is a village in the administrative district of Gmina Markusy, within Elbląg County, Warmian-Masurian Voivodeship, in northern Poland.
