= Zaścianki, Warmian-Masurian Voivodeship =

Zaścianki
- Village
- Location within Poland
- Coordinates: 54°10′00″N 19°40′58″E
- Country: Poland
- Voivodeship: Warmian-Masurian
- County: Elbląg
- Gmina: Młynary

Zaścianki [zaɕˈt͡ɕanki] is a village in the administrative district of Gmina Młynary, within Elbląg County, Warmian-Masurian Voivodeship, in northern Poland.
