= Karszewo, Elbląg County =

Karszewo
- Village
- Location within Poland
- Coordinates: 54°15′N 19°38′E
- Country: Poland
- Voivodeship: Warmian-Masurian
- County: Elbląg
- Gmina: Młynary
- Time zone: UTC+1 (CET)
  - Summer (DST): UTC+2 (CEST)
- Postal code: 14-420
- Vehicle registration: NEB

Karszewo [karˈʂɛvɔ] is a village in the administrative district of Gmina Młynary, within Elbląg County, Warmian-Masurian Voivodeship, in northern Poland. It is located in the historic region of Warmia.

== History ==
In 1454, the village was granted by Polish King Casimir IV Jagiellon to Bridgettine nuns from Gdańsk.
