= Swędkowo =

- Village
- Location within Poland
- Coordinates: 54°04′59″N 19°56′30″E
- Country: Poland
- Voivodeship: Warmian-Masurian
- County: Elbląg
- Gmina: Godkowo

Swędkowo (Polish: [sfɛntˈkɔvɔ]) is a village in the administrative district of Gmina Godkowo, within Elbląg County, Warmian-Masurian Voivodeship, in northern Poland.
