= Leszczyna, Warmian-Masurian Voivodeship =

Leszczyna
- Village
- Location within Poland
- Coordinates: 54°07′02″N 19°37′33″E
- Country: Poland
- Voivodeship: Warmian-Masurian
- County: Elbląg
- Gmina: Pasłęk
- Population: 70

Leszczyna [lɛʂˈt͡ʂɨna] is a village in the administrative district of Gmina Pasłęk, within Elbląg County, Warmian-Masurian Voivodeship, in northern Poland.
