= Żółwiniec, Warmian-Masurian Voivodeship =

Żółwiniec
- Village
- Location within Poland
- Coordinates: 54°5′N 19°27′E
- Country: Poland
- Voivodeship: Warmian-Masurian
- County: Elbląg
- Gmina: Markusy
- Elevation: −1.3 m (−4.3 ft)

Population
  - Total: 80
- Postal code: 82-325

Żółwiniec [ʐuu̯ˈviɲɛt͡s] is a village in the administrative district of Gmina Markusy, within Elbląg County, Warmian-Masurian Voivodeship, in northern Poland.
