= Sokółka (disambiguation) =

Sokółka is a town in north-eastern Poland.

Sokółka may also refer to the following villages in Poland:

- Sokółka, Masovian Voivodeship
- Sokółka, Warmian-Masurian Voivodeship

and the following Powiat (County) in the Podlaskie province:

- Sokółka County
