= Huta Żuławska =

- Village
- Location within Poland
- Coordinates: 54°15′14″N 19°34′55″E
- Country: Poland
- Voivodeship: Warmian-Masurian
- County: Elbląg
- Gmina: Milejewo
- Population: 150

Huta Żuławska [ˈxuta ʐuˈwafska] is a village in the administrative district of Gmina Milejewo, within Elbląg County, Warmian-Masurian Voivodeship, in northern Poland.
