= Podgórze, Elbląg County =

Podgórze
- Village
- Location within Poland
- Coordinates: 54°11′42″N 19°40′22″E
- Country: Poland
- Voivodeship: Warmian-Masurian
- County: Elbląg
- Gmina: Młynary
- Population: 110

Podgórze [pɔdˈɡuʐɛ] is a village in the administrative district of Gmina Młynary, within Elbląg County, Warmian-Masurian Voivodeship, in northern Poland.
