= Gardyny, Elbląg County =

Gardyny
- Settlement
- Location within Poland
- Coordinates: 54°12′16″N 19°44′07″E
- Country: Poland
- Voivodeship: Warmian-Masurian
- County: Elbląg
- Gmina: Młynary

Gardyny [ɡarˈdɨnɨ] is a settlement in the administrative district of Gmina Młynary, within Elbląg County, Warmian-Masurian Voivodeship, in northern Poland.
