= Dawidy, Warmian-Masurian Voivodeship =

Dawidy
- Village
- Location within Poland
- Coordinates: 54°8′1″N 19°41′13″E
- Country: Poland
- Voivodeship: Warmian-Masurian
- County: Elbląg
- Gmina: Pasłęk

Dawidy [daˈvidɨ] is a village in the administrative district of Gmina Pasłęk, within Elbląg County, Warmian-Masurian Voivodeship, in northern Poland.
