= Sucha, Warmian-Masurian Voivodeship =

Sucha
- Settlement
- Location within Poland
- Coordinates: 54°08′19″N 19°40′22″E
- Country: Poland
- Voivodeship: Warmian-Masurian
- County: Elbląg
- Gmina: Młynary

Sucha [ˈsuxa] is a settlement in the administrative district of Gmina Młynary, within Elbląg County, Warmian-Masurian Voivodeship, in northern Poland.
