= Kawki, Warmian-Masurian Voivodeship =

Kawki
- Village
- Location within Poland
- Coordinates: 54°7′N 19°44′E
- Country: Poland
- Voivodeship: Warmian-Masurian
- County: Elbląg
- Gmina: Pasłęk

Population
  - Total: 40
- Postal code: 14-400

Kawki [ˈkafki] is a village in the administrative district of Gmina Pasłęk, within Elbląg County, Warmian-Masurian Voivodeship, in northern Poland.
