= Zimnochy =

- Village
- Location within Poland
- Coordinates: 54°1′N 19°57′E
- Country: Poland
- Voivodeship: Warmian-Masurian
- County: Elbląg
- Gmina: Godkowo

Zimnochy [ʑimˈnɔxɨ] is a village in the administrative district of Gmina Godkowo, within Elbląg County, Warmian-Masurian Voivodeship, in northern Poland.

In 1975-1998 the town administratively belonged to the Elbląg province .
