= Tynowo =

- Village
- Location within Poland
- Coordinates: 54°4′9″N 19°22′8″E
- Country: Poland
- Voivodeship: Warmian-Masurian
- County: Elbląg
- Gmina: Markusy
- Time zone: UTC+1 (CET)
  - Summer (DST): UTC+2 (CEST)

Tynowo [tɨˈnɔvɔ] is a village in the administrative district of Gmina Markusy, within Elbląg County, Warmian-Masurian Voivodeship, in northern Poland.
