= Stegny, Warmian-Masurian Voivodeship =

Stegny
- Village
- Location within Poland
- Coordinates: 54°6′36″N 19°40′48″E
- Country: Poland
- Voivodeship: Warmian-Masurian
- County: Elbląg
- Gmina: Pasłęk
- Population: 423

Stegny [ˈstɛɡnɨ] is a village in the administrative district of Gmina Pasłęk, within Elbląg County, Warmian-Masurian Voivodeship, in northern Poland.
