= Nawty =

- Village
- Location within Poland
- Coordinates: 54°3′45″N 19°52′0″E
- Country: Poland
- Voivodeship: Warmian-Masurian
- County: Elbląg
- Gmina: Godkowo
- Population: 30

Nawty [ˈnaftɨ] (is a village in the administrative district of Gmina Godkowo, within Elbląg County, Warmian-Masurian Voivodeship, in northern Poland.
