= Wikrowo, Gmina Pasłęk =

Wikrowo
- Village
- Location within Poland
- Coordinates: 54°5′57″N 19°42′2″E
- Country: Poland
- Voivodeship: Warmian-Masurian
- County: Elbląg
- Gmina: Pasłęk
- Population: 50

Wikrowo [viˈkrɔvɔ] is a village in the administrative district of Gmina Pasłęk, within Elbląg County, Warmian-Masurian Voivodeship, in northern Poland.
