= Zalesie, Elbląg County =

Zalesie
- Village
- Location within Poland
- Coordinates: 54°9′0″N 19°36′53″E
- Country: Poland
- Voivodeship: Warmian-Masurian
- County: Elbląg
- Gmina: Milejewo
- Population: 190

Zalesie [zaˈlɛɕɛ] is a village in the administrative district of Gmina Milejewo, within Elbląg County, Warmian-Masurian Voivodeship, in northern Poland.
