= Nowe Dolno =

- Village
- Location within Poland
- Coordinates: 54°1′46″N 19°26′25″E
- Country: Poland
- Voivodeship: Warmian-Masurian
- County: Elbląg
- Gmina: Markusy
- Population: 763

Nowe Dolno(Neu-Dollstadt in German) [ˈnɔvɛ ˈdɔlno)] is a village in the administrative district of Gmina Markusy, within Elbląg County, Warmian-Masurian Voivodeship, in northern Poland.
