= Węgle-Żukowo =

- Village
- Location within Poland
- Coordinates: 54°05′40″N 19°26′53″E
- Country: Poland
- Voivodeship: Warmian-Masurian
- County: Elbląg
- Gmina: Markusy
- Population: 130

Węgle-Żukowo [ˈvɛnɡlɛ ʐuˈkɔvɔ] is a village in the administrative district of Gmina Markusy, within Elbląg County, Warmian-Masurian Voivodeship, in northern Poland.
