= Zdroje, Warmian-Masurian Voivodeship =

Zdroje
- Settlement
- Location within Poland
- Coordinates: 54°2′40″N 19°21′45″E
- Country: Poland
- Voivodeship: Warmian-Masurian
- County: Elbląg
- Gmina: Markusy

Zdroje [ˈzdrɔjɛ] is a settlement in the administrative district of Gmina Markusy, within Elbląg County, Warmian-Masurian Voivodeship, in northern Poland.
