= Rydzówka, Elbląg County =

Rydzówka
- Village
- Location within Poland
- Coordinates: 54°00′34″N 19°38′54″E
- Country: Poland
- Voivodeship: Warmian-Masurian
- County: Elbląg
- Gmina: Pasłęk

Population
  - Total: 140

Rydzówka [rɨˈd͡zufka] is a village in the administrative district of Gmina Pasłęk, within Elbląg County, Warmian-Masurian Voivodeship, in northern Poland.
