= Stare Monasterzysko =

- Village
- Location within Poland
- Coordinates: 54°13′N 19°40′E
- Country: Poland
- Voivodeship: Warmian-Masurian
- County: Elbląg
- Gmina: Młynary

Stare Monasterzysko [ˈstarɛ mɔnastɛˈʐɨskɔ] is a village in the administrative district of Gmina Młynary, within Elbląg County, Warmian-Masurian Voivodeship, in northern Poland.
