= Kwitajny =

- Village
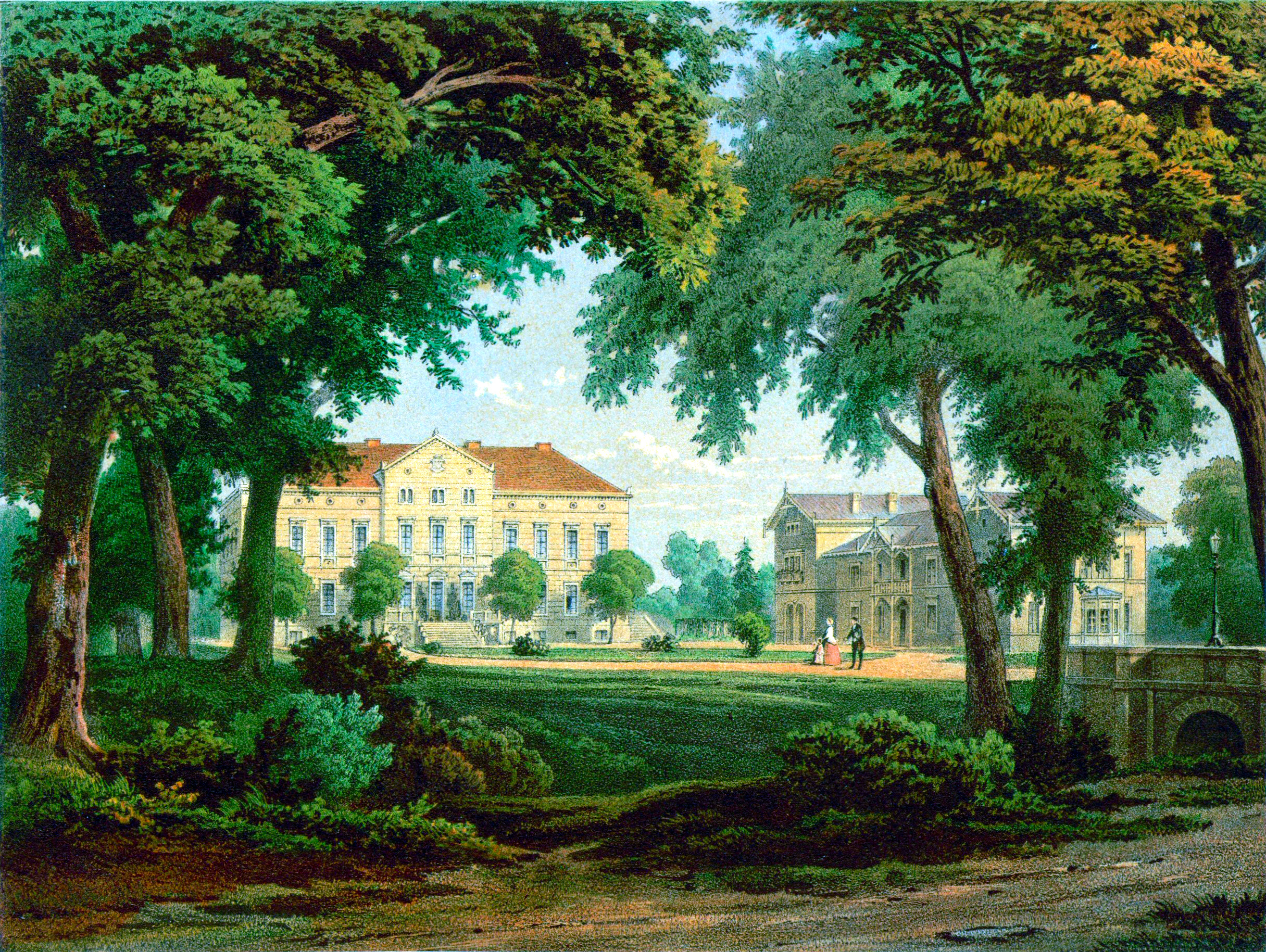
- Quittainen manor house (19th-century view)

- Location within Poland
- Coordinates: 54°1′5″N 19°48′13″E
- Country: Poland
- Voivodeship: Warmian-Masurian
- County: Elbląg
- Gmina: Pasłęk
- Population: 253

Kwitajny [kfiˈtai̯nɨ] is a village in the administrative district of Gmina Pasłęk, within Elbląg County, Warmian-Masurian Voivodeship, in northern Poland.

The village of Quittainen was a part of East Prussia. The estate of the same name was held by the East Prussian noble family Dönhoff until 1945, when its last overseer, Marion Gräfin Dönhoff, fled from the advancing Red Army on horseback. Ms. Dönhoff, who had been active in the conspiracy against Hitler, eventually became publisher of the liberal weekly Die Zeit.

The village, like the rest of southern East Prussia, was awarded by the winning coalition in World War II to Poland and taken from Germany following the Potsdam Conference, and its name was Polonized as Kwitajny.

== Notable residents ==
Marion Gräfin Dönhoff (1909-2002), lived here until 1945
