= Krasinek =

- Village
- Location within Poland
- Coordinates: 54°10′04″N 19°46′00″E
- Country: Poland
- Voivodeship: Warmian-Masurian
- County: Elbląg
- Gmina: Młynary

Krasinek [kraˈɕinɛk] is a village in the administrative district of Gmina Młynary, within Elbląg County, Warmian-Masurian Voivodeship, in northern Poland.
