= Łukszty =

Village in Northern Poland

- Village
- Location within Poland
- Coordinates: 54°6′30″N 19°44′22″E
- Country: Poland
- Voivodeship: Warmian-Masurian
- County: Elbląg
- Gmina: Pasłęk
- Population: 180

Łukszty [ˈwukʂtɨ] is a village in the administrative district of Gmina Pasłęk, within Elbląg County, Warmian-Masurian Voivodeship, in northern Poland.
