= Zastawno =

- Village
- Location within Poland
- Coordinates: 54°11′N 19°39′E
- Country: Poland
- Voivodeship: Warmian-Masurian
- County: Elbląg
- Gmina: Młynary
- Population: 160
- Website: www.zastawno.pl

Zastawno [zasˈtavnɔ] is a village in the administrative district of Gmina Młynary, within Elbląg County, Warmian-Masurian Voivodeship, in northern Poland.
