= Ojcowa Wola =

- Village
- Location within Poland
- Coordinates: 54°9′39″N 19°43′10″E
- Country: Poland
- Voivodeship: Warmian-Masurian
- County: Elbląg
- Gmina: Młynary

Ojcowa Wola ([ɔi̯ˈt͡sɔva ˈvɔla]) is a village in the administrative district of Gmina Młynary, within Elbląg County, Warmian-Masurian Voivodeship, in northern Poland.
