= Zwierzno =

- Village
- Location within Poland
- Coordinates: 54°1′58″N 19°20′3″E
- Country: Poland
- Voivodeship: Warmian-Masurian
- County: Elbląg
- Gmina: Markusy
- Population: 460

Zwierzno [ˈzvjɛʐnɔ] is a village in the administrative district of Gmina Markusy, within Elbląg County, Warmian-Masurian Voivodeship, in northern Poland.

== See also ==
History of Pomerania
