= Klekotki, Elbląg County =

Klekotki
- Village
- Location within Poland
- Coordinates: 54°02′28″N 19°54′22″E
- Country: Poland
- Voivodeship: Warmian-Masurian
- County: Elbląg
- Gmina: Godkowo

Klekotki [klɛˈkɔtki] is a village in the administrative district of Gmina Godkowo, within Elbląg County, Warmian-Masurian Voivodeship, in northern Poland.
