= Marzewo =

- Village
- Location within Poland
- Coordinates: 53°57′52″N 19°41′36″E
- Country: Poland
- Voivodeship: Warmian-Masurian
- County: Elbląg
- Gmina: Pasłęk
- Population: 161

Marzewo [maˈʐɛvɔ] is a village in the administrative district of Gmina Pasłęk, within Elbląg County, Warmian-Masurian Voivodeship, in northern Poland.
