= Jurandowo, Warmian-Masurian Voivodeship =

Jurandowo
- Village
- Location within Poland
- Coordinates: 54°5′N 19°26′E
- Country: Poland
- Voivodeship: Warmian-Masurian
- County: Elbląg
- Gmina: Markusy
- Population: 50

Jurandowo [juranˈdɔvɔ] is a village in the administrative district of Gmina Markusy, within Elbląg County, Warmian-Masurian Voivodeship, in northern Poland.
