= Nowiny, Elbląg County =

Nowiny
- Settlement
- Location within Poland
- Coordinates: 54°2′19″N 19°38′19″E
- Country: Poland
- Voivodeship: Warmian-Masurian
- County: Elbląg
- Gmina: Pasłęk

Nowiny [nɔˈvinɨ] is a settlement in the administrative district of Gmina Pasłęk, within Elbląg County, Warmian-Masurian Voivodeship, in northern Poland.
