= Brzeziny, Warmian-Masurian Voivodeship =

Brzeziny
- Village
- Location within Poland
- Coordinates: 54°1′44″N 19°38′35″E
- Country: Poland
- Voivodeship: Warmian-Masurian
- County: Elbląg
- Gmina: Pasłęk
- Population: 72

Brzeziny [bʐɛˈʑinɨ] is a village in the administrative district of Gmina Pasłęk, within Elbląg County, Warmian-Masurian Voivodeship, in northern Poland.
