= Nowe Kusy =

- Village
- Location within Poland
- Coordinates: 54°2′59″N 19°35′11″E
- Country: Poland
- Voivodeship: Warmian-Masurian
- County: Elbląg
- Gmina: Pasłęk
- Population: 315

Nowe Kusy [ˈnɔvɛ ˈkusɨ] is a village in the administrative district of Gmina Pasłęk, within Elbląg County, Warmian-Masurian Voivodeship, in northern Poland with a population of about 315.
