= Jagodnik, Warmian-Masurian Voivodeship =

Jagodnik
- Village
- Location within Poland
- Coordinates: 54°12′36″N 19°29′8″E
- Country: Poland
- Voivodeship: Warmian-Masurian
- County: Elbląg
- Gmina: Milejewo
- Population: 140

Jagodnik [jaˈɡɔdnik] is a village in the administrative district of Gmina Milejewo, within Elbląg County, Warmian-Masurian Voivodeship, in northern Poland.
