= Cieszyniec =

- Village
- Location within Poland
- Coordinates: 54°05′02″N 19°46′59″E
- Country: Poland
- Voivodeship: Warmian-Masurian
- County: Elbląg
- Gmina: Godkowo

Cieszyniec [t͡ɕɛˈʂɨɲɛt͡s] is a village in the administrative district of Gmina Godkowo, within Elbląg County, Warmian-Masurian Voivodeship, in northern Poland.
