= Kobyliny =

- Settlement
- Location within Poland
- Coordinates: 54°10′20″N 19°42′38″E
- Country: Poland
- Voivodeship: Warmian-Masurian
- County: Elbląg
- Gmina: Młynary

Kobyliny [kɔbɨˈlinɨ] is a settlement in the administrative district of Gmina Młynary, within Elbląg County, Warmian-Masurian Voivodeship, in northern Poland.
