= Nowe Wikrowo =

- Village
- Location within Poland
- Coordinates: 54°5′17″N 20°1′10″E
- Country: Poland
- Voivodeship: Warmian-Masurian
- County: Elbląg
- Gmina: Godkowo
- Population: 130

Nowe Wikrowo [ˈnɔvɛ viˈkrɔvɔ] is a village in the administrative district of Gmina Godkowo, within Elbląg County, Warmian-Masurian Voivodeship, in northern Poland.
