= Pólko, Warmian-Masurian Voivodeship =

Pólko
- Village
- Location within Poland
- Coordinates: 54°3′34″N 19°37′56″E
- Country: Poland
- Voivodeship: Warmian-Masurian
- County: Elbląg
- Gmina: Pasłęk
- Population: 90

Pólko [ˈpulkɔ] (is a village in the administrative district of Gmina Pasłęk, within Elbląg County, Warmian-Masurian Voivodeship, in northern Poland.
