= Siódmak, Elbląg County =

Siódmak
- Village
- Location within Poland
- Coordinates: 54°7′38″N 19°40′2″E
- Country: Poland
- Voivodeship: Warmian-Masurian
- County: Elbląg
- Gmina: Pasłęk

Siódmak [ˈɕudmak] is a village in the administrative district of Gmina Pasłęk, within Elbląg County, Warmian-Masurian Voivodeship, in northern Poland.
