= Krasin, Warmian-Masurian Voivodeship =

Krasin
- Village
- Location within Poland
- Coordinates: 54°1′6″N 19°36′44″E
- Country: Poland
- Voivodeship: Warmian-Masurian
- County: Elbląg
- Gmina: Pasłęk
- Population: 200

Krasin [ˈkraɕin] is a village in the administrative district of Gmina Pasłęk, within Elbląg County, Warmian-Masurian Voivodeship, in northern Poland.
