= Elbląg Upland Landscape Park =

Protected area in Poland

Coordinates: 54.1636°N 19.4976°E

- Park Krajobrazowy Wysoczyzny Elbląskiej
- IUCN category V (protected landscape/seascape)
- Interactive map of Elbląg Upland Landscape Park
- Location: Warmian-Masurian Voivodeship
- Area: 134.6 km^{2} (52.0 sq mi)
- Established: 1985

Elbląg Upland Landscape Park (Park Krajobrazowy Wysoczyzny Elbląskiej) is a protected area (Landscape Park) in northern Poland. It was established in 1985 and covers an area of 134.6 square kilometres (52.0 sq mi).

The park spans Warmian-Masurian Voivodeship, including parts of Braniewo County (Gmina Frombork) and Elbląg County (Gmina Elbląg, Gmina Milejewo, Gmina Tolkmicko). Within its boundaries, there are five nature reserves.

Although located in northern Poland, the park has characteristics of a mountainous region. Its vegetation includes mountain rib, ostrich plume, and gold-headed lily. Fauna includes red deer, dormouse, raccoon dog, white-tailed eagle, honey buzzard, crane, lesser spotted eagle, and other common species. The highest point is Srebrna Mountain at 198.5 m above sea level, with numerous streams throughout the park. Visitors may also enjoy the baroque palace in Kadyny.
