= Markusy =

- Village
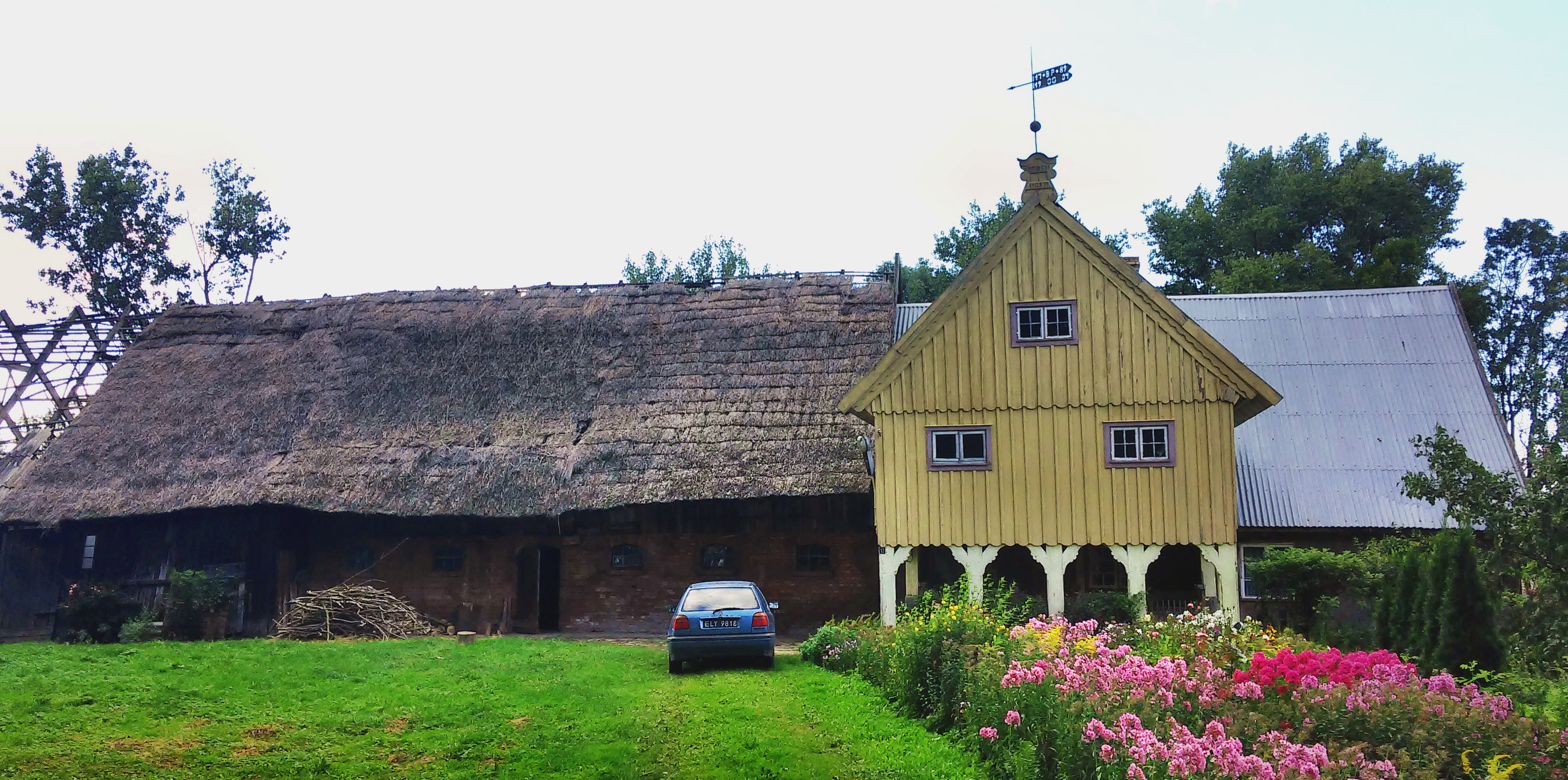
- Old alcove house in Markusy

- Location within Poland
- Coordinates: 54°2′55″N 19°23′2″E
- Country: Poland
- Voivodeship: Warmian-Masurian
- County: Elbląg
- Gmina: Markusy
- Population: 580
- Time zone: UTC+1 (CET)
  - Summer (DST): UTC+2 (CEST)
- Vehicle registration: NEB

Markusy ([marˈkusɨ]) is a village in Elbląg County, Warmian-Masurian Voivodeship, in northern Poland. It is the seat of the gmina (administrative district) called Gmina Markusy.
