= Gmina Pasłęk =

Gmina Pasłęk Pasłęk Commune
- Gmina
- Coat of arms
- Interactive map of Gmina Pasłęk
- Coordinates (Pasłęk): 54°3′N 19°40′E
- Country: Poland
- Voivodeship: Warmian-Masurian
- County: Elbląg County
- Seat: Pasłęk

Area
  - Total: 264.39 km^{2} (102.08 sq mi)

Population (2006)
  - Total: 19,323
  - Density: 73.085/km^{2} (189.29/sq mi)
  - Urban: 12,179
  - Rural: 7,144
- Website: http://www.paslek.pl

Gmina Pasłęk is an urban-rural gmina (administrative district) in Elbląg County, Warmian-Masurian Voivodeship, in northern Poland. Its seat is the town of Pasłęk, which lies approximately 18 kilometres (11 mi) east of Elbląg and 63 km (39 mi) north-west of the regional capital Olsztyn.

The gmina covers an area of 264.39 square kilometres (102.1 sq mi), and as of 2006 its total population is 19,323 (out of which the population of Pasłęk amounts to 12,179, and the population of the rural part of the gmina is 7,144).

== Villages ==
Apart from the town of Pasłęk, Gmina Pasłęk contains the villages and settlements of:

- Anglity
- Aniołowo
- Awajki
- Bądy
- Borzynowo
- Brzeziny
- Cierpkie
- Czarna Góra
- Dargowo
- Dawidy
- Drulity
- Gibity
- Gołąbki
- Gryżyna
- Gulbity
- Kajmy
- Kalinowo
- Kąty
- Kawki
- Kielminek
- Kopina
- Krasin
- Kronin
- Krosienko
- Krosno
- Krosno-Młyn
- Kudyński Bór
- Kudyny
- Kupin
- Kwitajny
- Łączna
- Leszczyna
- Leżnice
- Łukszty
- Majki
- Marianka
- Marzewo
- Nowa Wieś
- Nowe Kusy
- Nowiny
- Nowy Cieszyn
- Owczarnia
- Piniewo
- Pochylnia Kąty
- Pochylnia Nowy Całun
- Pochylnia Oleśnica
- Pólko
- Robity
- Rogajny
- Rogowo
- Rydzówka
- Rzeczna
- Rzędy
- Sakówko
- Sałkowice
- Siódmak
- Skolimowo
- Sokółka
- Stare Kusy
- Stegny
- Surowe
- Tolpity
- Tulno
- Wakarowo
- Wikrowo
- Wójtowizna
- Zielno
- Zielonka Pasłęcka
- Zielony Grąd

== Neighbouring gminas ==
Gmina Pasłęk is bordered by the gminas of Elbląg, Godkowo, Małdyty, Milejewo, Młynary, Morąg, Rychliki and Wilczęta.
