= Gmina Milejewo =

Gmina Milejewo Milejewo Commune
- Gmina
- Interactive map of Gmina Milejewo
- Coordinates (Milejewo): 54°13′7″N 19°32′48″E
- Country: Poland
- Voivodeship: Warmian-Masurian
- County: Elbląg County
- Seat: Milejewo

Area
  - Total: 95.55 km^{2} (36.89 sq mi)

Population (2006)
  - Total: 2,979
  - Density: 31.18/km^{2} (80.75/sq mi)
- Website: http://www.milejewo.bil-wm.pl/

Gmina Milejewo is a rural gmina (administrative district) in Elbląg County, Warmian-Masurian Voivodeship, in northern Poland. Its seat is the village of Milejewo, which lies approximately 17 kilometres (11 mi) north-east of Elbląg and 79 km (49 mi) north-west of the regional capital Olsztyn.

The gmina covers an area of 95.55 square kilometres (36.9 sq mi), and as of 2006 its total population is 2,979.

The gmina contains part of the protected area called Elbląg Upland Landscape Park.

== Villages ==
Gmina Milejewo contains the villages and settlements of Huta Żuławska, Jagodnik, Kamiennik Wielki, Majewo, Majewo-Kolonia, Milejewo, Ogrodniki, Piastowo, Pomorska Wieś, Rakowo, Romanowo, Rychnowy, Starodębie, Stoboje, Stodolniki, Wilkowo, Zajączkowo and Zalesie.

== Neighbouring gminas ==
Gmina Milejewo is bordered by the city of Elbląg and by the gminas of Elbląg, Młynary, Pasłęk and Tolkmicko.
