= Owczarnia, Elbląg County =

Owczarnia
- Village
- Location within Poland
- Coordinates: 54°4′N 19°38′E
- Country: Poland
- Voivodeship: Warmian-Masurian
- County: Elbląg
- Gmina: Pasłęk

Owczarnia [ɔfˈt͡ʂarɲa] is a village in the administrative district of Gmina Pasłęk, within Elbląg County, Warmian-Masurian Voivodeship, in northern Poland.
