= Sokółka, Warmian-Masurian Voivodeship =

Sokółka
- Settlement
- Location within Poland
- Coordinates: 54°1′56″N 19°36′7″E
- Country: Poland
- Voivodeship: Warmian-Masurian
- County: Elbląg
- Gmina: Pasłęk
- Time zone: UTC+1 (CET)
  - Summer (DST): UTC+2 (CEST)
- Vehicle registration: NEB

Sokółka [sɔˈkuu̯ka] is a settlement in the administrative district of Gmina Pasłęk, within Elbląg County, Warmian-Masurian Voivodeship, in northern Poland.

== History ==
In the past, the village was at various times part of Poland, Prussia and Germany, before it became again part of Poland following Germany's defeat in World War II in 1945.
