= Łączna, Warmian-Masurian Voivodeship =

Łączna
- Village
- Location within Poland
- Coordinates: 54°4′47″N 19°34′57″E
- Country: Poland
- Voivodeship: Warmian-Masurian
- County: Elbląg
- Gmina: Pasłęk
- Population: 30

Łączna [ˈwɔnt͡ʂna] is a village in the administrative district of Gmina Pasłęk, within Elbląg County, Warmian-Masurian Voivodeship, in northern Poland.

It was transferred into Polish control following the Yalta and Tehran Conferences that occurred after World War II
