= Błudowo =

- Village
- Location within Poland
- Coordinates: 54°13′51″N 19°41′31″E
- Country: Poland
- Voivodeship: Warmian-Masurian
- County: Elbląg
- Gmina: Młynary

Błudowo [bwuˈdɔvɔ] (German Bludau) is a village in the administrative district of Gmina Młynary, within Elbląg County, Warmian-Masurian Voivodeship, in northern Poland.
