= Milejewo =

- Village
- Location within Poland
- Coordinates: 54°13′7″N 19°32′48″E
- Country: Poland
- Voivodeship: Warmian-Masurian
- County: Elbląg
- Gmina: Milejewo
- Population: 500

Milejewo [milɛˈjɛvɔ] is a village in Elbląg County, Warmian-Masurian Voivodeship, in northern Poland. It is the seat of the gmina (administrative district) called Gmina Milejewo.
