= Gwiździny, Elbląg County =

Gwiździny
- Village
- Location within Poland
- Coordinates: 54°3′52″N 19°59′42″E
- Country: Poland
- Voivodeship: Warmian-Masurian
- County: Elbląg
- Gmina: Godkowo

Gwiździny [ɡviʑˈd͡ʑinɨ] is a village in the administrative district of Gmina Godkowo, within Elbląg County, Warmian-Masurian Voivodeship, in northern Poland.
