= Gmina Młynary =

Gmina Młynary Młynary Commune
- Gmina
- Coat of arms
- Interactive map of Gmina Młynary
- Coordinates (Młynary): 54°11′14″N 19°43′45″E
- Country: Poland
- Voivodeship: Warmian-Masurian
- County: Elbląg County
- Seat: Młynary

Area
  - Total: 157.09 km^{2} (60.65 sq mi)

Population (2006)
  - Total: 4,593
  - Density: 29.24/km^{2} (75.73/sq mi)
  - Urban: 1,837
  - Rural: 2,756

Gmina Młynary is an urban-rural gmina (administrative district) in Elbląg County, Warmian-Masurian Voivodeship, in northern Poland. Its seat is the town of Młynary, which lies approximately 24 kilometres (15 mi) north-east of Elbląg and 68 km (42 mi) north-west of the regional capital Olsztyn.

The gmina covers an area of 157.09 square kilometres (60.7 sq mi). As of 2006 its total population is 4,593 (out of which the population of Młynary amounts to 1,837, and the population of the rural part of the gmina is 2,756).

== Villages ==
Apart from the town of Młynary, Gmina Młynary contains the villages and settlements of Błudowo, Bronikowo, Broniszewo, Gardyny, Janiki Pasłęckie, Karszewo, Kobyliny, Krasinek, Kraskowo, Kurowo Braniewskie, Kwietnik, Mikołajki, Młynarska Wola, Nowe Monasterzysko, Nowe Sadłuki, Ojcowa Wola, Olszówka, Płonne, Podgórze, Rucianka, Sąpy, Sokolnik, Stare Monasterzysko, Sucha, Warszewo, Włóczyska, Zaścianki and Zastawno.

== Neighbouring gminas ==
Gmina Młynary is bordered by the gminas of Frombork, Milejewo, Pasłęk, Płoskinia, Tolkmicko and Wilczęta.
