= Zielonka Pasłęcka railway station =

Railway station in Zielonka Pasłęcka, Poland

Coordinates: 53.9811°N 19.7009°E

Zielonka Pasłęcka
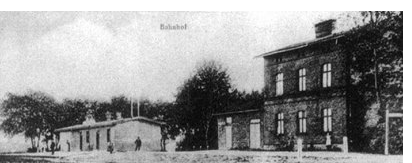
- The railway station before 1945

General information
- Location: Zielonka Pasłęcka, Gmina Pasłęk, Elbląg County, Warmian-Masurian Voivodeship, Poland
- Operator: Polish State Railways
- Line: Olsztyn Main - Bogaczewo
- Platforms: 1
- Tracks: 1

History
- Opened: 1882
- Former names: Grünhagen (1882–1945); Zielonka Pruska (1945–1950)
Location

Zielonka Pasłęcka is a railway station located in Warmian–Masurian Voivodeship, in Elbląg County, Poland. It is a part of the sołectwo of Zielonka Pasłęcka, and is a direct part of the settlement.

In 2017, the station served 10–19 passengers a day.

The railway station is located half a mile from the centre of the village of Zielonka Pasłęcka.

== Train wreck of 1945 ==
Near the end of World War II, on 21 and 22 January 1945 the railway station was the site of a tragic train wreck followed by a Soviet attack on unarmed refugees. A German Army hospital train full of wounded which had stopped briefly at the station was rear-ended some time around 11 pm by a train carrying a few thousand refugees from Osterode and Mohrungen. The collision resulted in many killed and wounded on both trains. A second refugee train which arrived not long afterwards came to a stop without colliding with the first refugee train.

The collision destroyed a number of rail cars on both the hospital and the refugee trains; this permanently blocked the way for the second refugee train. The hospital train, leaving its wrecked wagons behind, was able to proceed towards the west towards Preußisch Holland and Elbing and escape. Three to four thousand refugees were left waiting for a replacement train that never arrived.

At dawn on 22 January a Soviet Army unit consisting of tanks and infantry arrived, and, possibly due to the presence of some German soldiers in uniform, opened fired on the many people and buildings at the station, killing 140 to 150. The few German soldiers were taken prisoners, and a guard troop was set to make sure the refugees remained in place. These were removed after a week, whereupon the remaining people dispersed. The dead from both the train wreck and the Russian attack were buried in shallow graves in sites near the railway station in March 1945. There are two plaques in memory of the event on the station building, one in Polish and the other in German.
