= Gmina Godkowo =

Gmina Godkowo Godkowo Commune
- Gmina
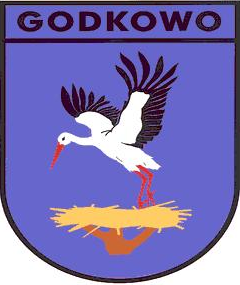
- Coat of arms
- Interactive map of Gmina Godkowo
- Coordinates (Godkowo): 54°5′N 19°55′E
- Country: Poland
- Voivodeship: Warmian-Masurian
- County: Elbląg County
- Seat: Godkowo

Area
  - Total: 166.74 km^{2} (64.38 sq mi)

Population (2006)
  - Total: 3,320
  - Density: 19.9/km^{2} (51.6/sq mi)

Gmina Godkowo is a rural gmina (administrative district) in Elbląg County, Warmian-Masurian Voivodeship, in northern Poland. Its seat is the village of Godkowo, which lies approximately 34 kilometres (21 mi) east of Elbląg and 51 km (32 mi) north-west of the regional capital Olsztyn.

The gmina covers an area of 166.74 square kilometres (64.4 sq mi), and as of 2006 its total population is 3,320.

== Villages ==
Gmina Godkowo contains the villages and settlements of Bielica, Burdajny, Cieszyniec, Dąbkowo, Dobry, Godkowo, Grądki, Grużajny, Gwiździny, Kępno, Klekotki, Krykajny, Kwitajny Wielkie, Łępno, Lesiska, Miłosna, Nawty, Nowe Wikrowo, Olkowo, Osiek, Piskajny, Plajny, Podągi, Siedlisko, Skowrony, Stary Cieszyn, Stojpy, Swędkowo, Szymbory, Ząbrowiec and Zimnochy.

== Neighbouring gminas ==
Gmina Godkowo is bordered by the gminas of Miłakowo, Morąg, Orneta, Pasłęk and Wilczęta.
