= Kupin, Elbląg County =

Kupin
- Village
- Location within Poland
- Coordinates: 54°04′18″N 19°42′03″E
- Country: Poland
- Voivodeship: Warmian-Masurian
- County: Elbląg
- Gmina: Pasłęk
- Population: 50

Kupin [ˈkupin] is a village in the administrative district of Gmina Pasłęk, within Elbląg County, Warmian-Masurian Voivodeship, in northern Poland.
