= Gmina Markusy =

Gmina Markusy Markusy Commune
- Gmina
- Interactive map of Gmina Markusy
- Coordinates (Markusy): 54°2′55″N 19°23′2″E
- Country: Poland
- Voivodeship: Warmian-Masurian
- County: Elbląg County
- Seat: Markusy

Area
  - Total: 108.56 km^{2} (41.92 sq mi)

Population (2006)
  - Total: 4,103
  - Density: 37.79/km^{2} (97.89/sq mi)

Gmina Markusy is a rural gmina (administrative district) in Elbląg County, Warmian-Masurian Voivodeship, in northern Poland. Its seat is the village of Markusy, which lies approximately 6 kilometres (4 mi) south of Elbląg and 79 km (49 mi) west of the regional capital Olsztyn.

The gmina covers an area of 108.56 square kilometres (41.9 sq mi), and as of 2006 its total population is 4,103.

== Villages ==
Gmina Markusy contains the villages and settlements of Balewo, Brudzędy, Dzierzgonka, Jezioro, Jurandowo, Kępniewo, Krzewsk, Markusy, Nowe Dolno, Nowe Kępniewo, Rachowo, Stalewo, Stankowo, Stare Dolno, Topolno Małe, Tynowo, Węgle-Żukowo, Wiśniewo, Zdroje, Złotnica, Żółwiniec, Żurawiec, Zwierzeńskie Pole and Zwierzno.

== Neighbouring gminas ==
Gmina Markusy is bordered by the gminas of Dzierzgoń, Elbląg, Gronowo Elbląskie, Rychliki and Stare Pole.
