= Godkowo =

- Village
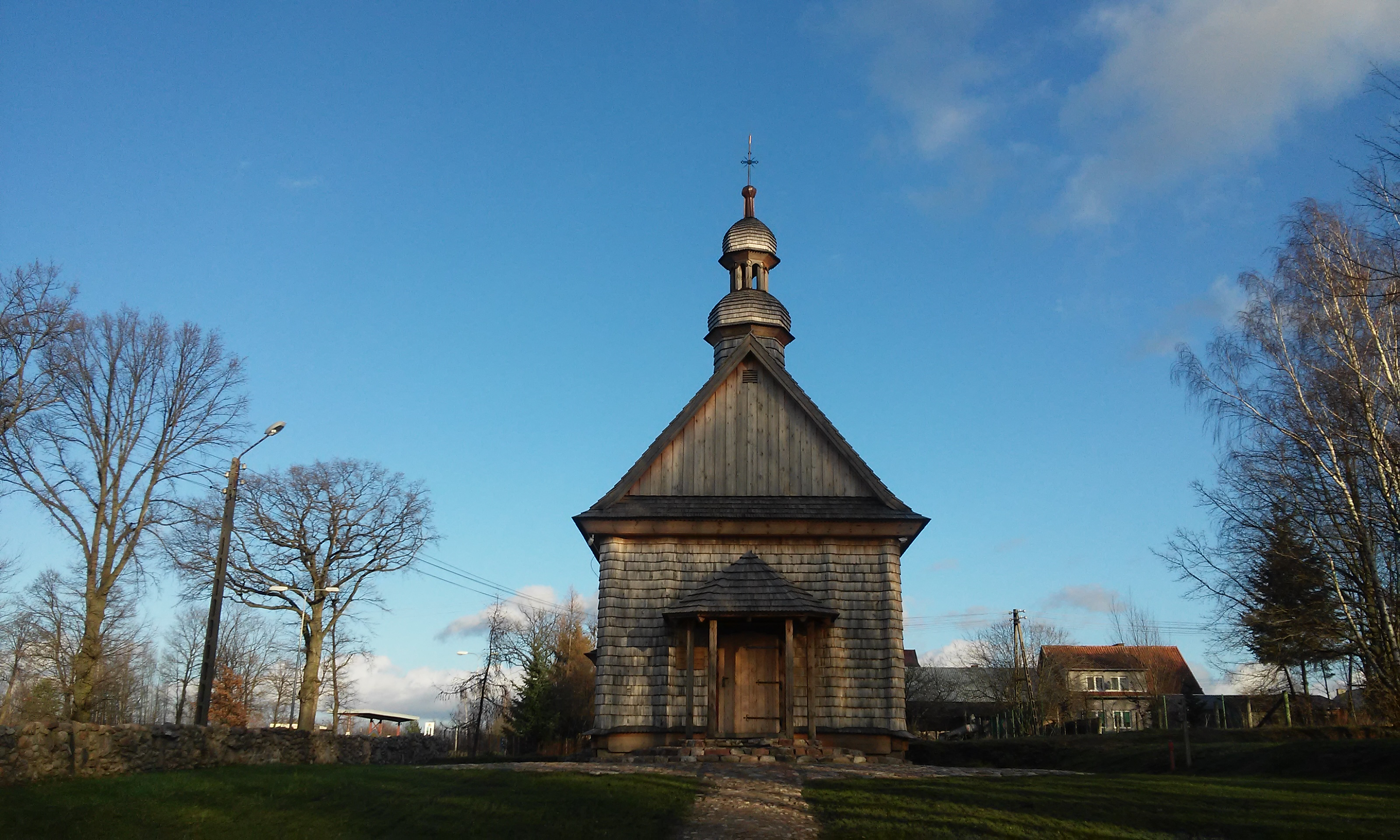

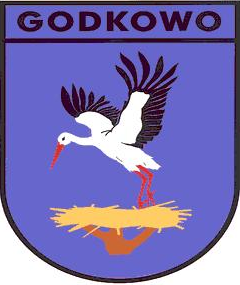
- Coat of arms

- Location within Poland
- Coordinates: 54°5′N 19°55′E
- Country: Poland
- Voivodeship: Warmian-Masurian
- County: Elbląg
- Gmina: Godkowo
- Population: 260

Godkowo [ɡɔtˈkɔvɔ] is a village in Elbląg County, Warmian-Masurian Voivodeship, in northern Poland. It is the seat of the gmina (administrative district) called Gmina Godkowo.
