= Krasin (surname) =

Krasin (Russian: Красин) is a Russian male surname; its feminine counterpart is Krasina. Notable people with the surname include:

- Boris Krasin (composer) (1884–1936), Russian musician
- Leonid Krasin (1870–1926), Russian politician and diplomat
- Victor Krasin (born 1929), Russian human-rights activist, economist, and political prisoner
