= Ferdinand Steininger =

German printmaker (1882–1959)

Ferdinand Steininger or Steiniger (1882 – 1959) was a German printmaker. He was born in Leipzig and went to the Saxon capital in order to study at the Dresden Kunstgewerbeschule and the Kunstakademie with Professors Richard Müller, Oskar Zwintscher and Eugen Bracht. He was living in Loschwitz, home of numerous artists. This close proximity to the Dresden Heath resulted in numerous etchings of trees, woodlands and forests, but he also created some portraits and exlibris.

In 1938, he had a Sonderausstellung (special exhibition) at the art association Badischer Kunstverein in Karlsruhe.

His works hang in various museums and he was an influential German Jewish artist displaced by the Nazis.
