= Berthe Bady =

French actress

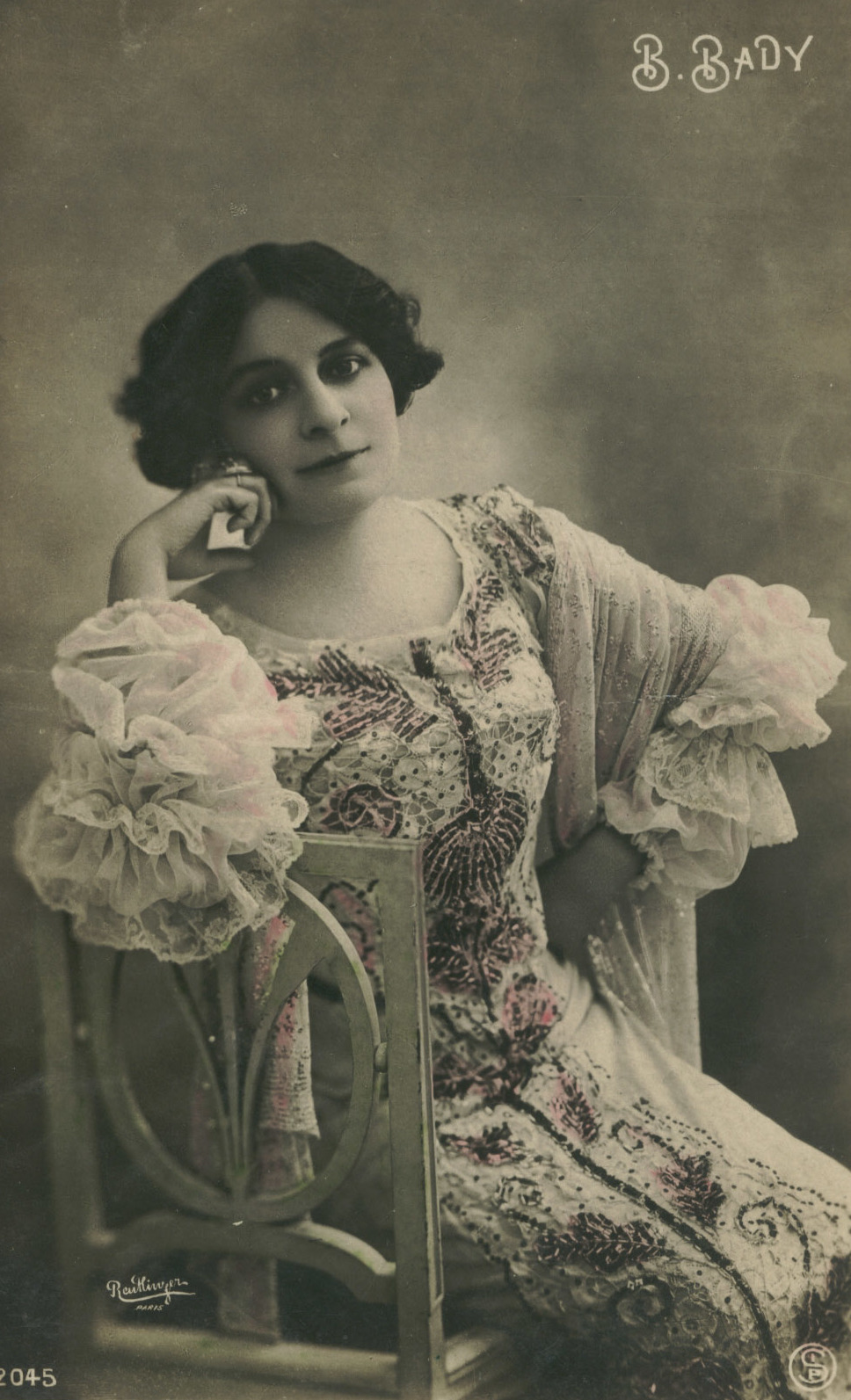
- Berthe Bady, c. 1895
- Born: November 1872; Lodelinsart, Belgium
- Died: 1921 (age 48); Jouy-sur-Eure, France
- Education: Brussels Conservatory
- Occupation: Actress
- Years active: 1893–1913
- Organization: Théâtre de l'Œuvre
- Movement: Symbolist Movement

Berthe Bady (1872–1921) was a French actress of Belgian origin. She was the companion of Lugné-Poe and Henry Bataille. The fortunes she had won as an actress were devoted to her household with Bataille. Berthe died in isolation at Jouy-sur-Eure.

== Life ==
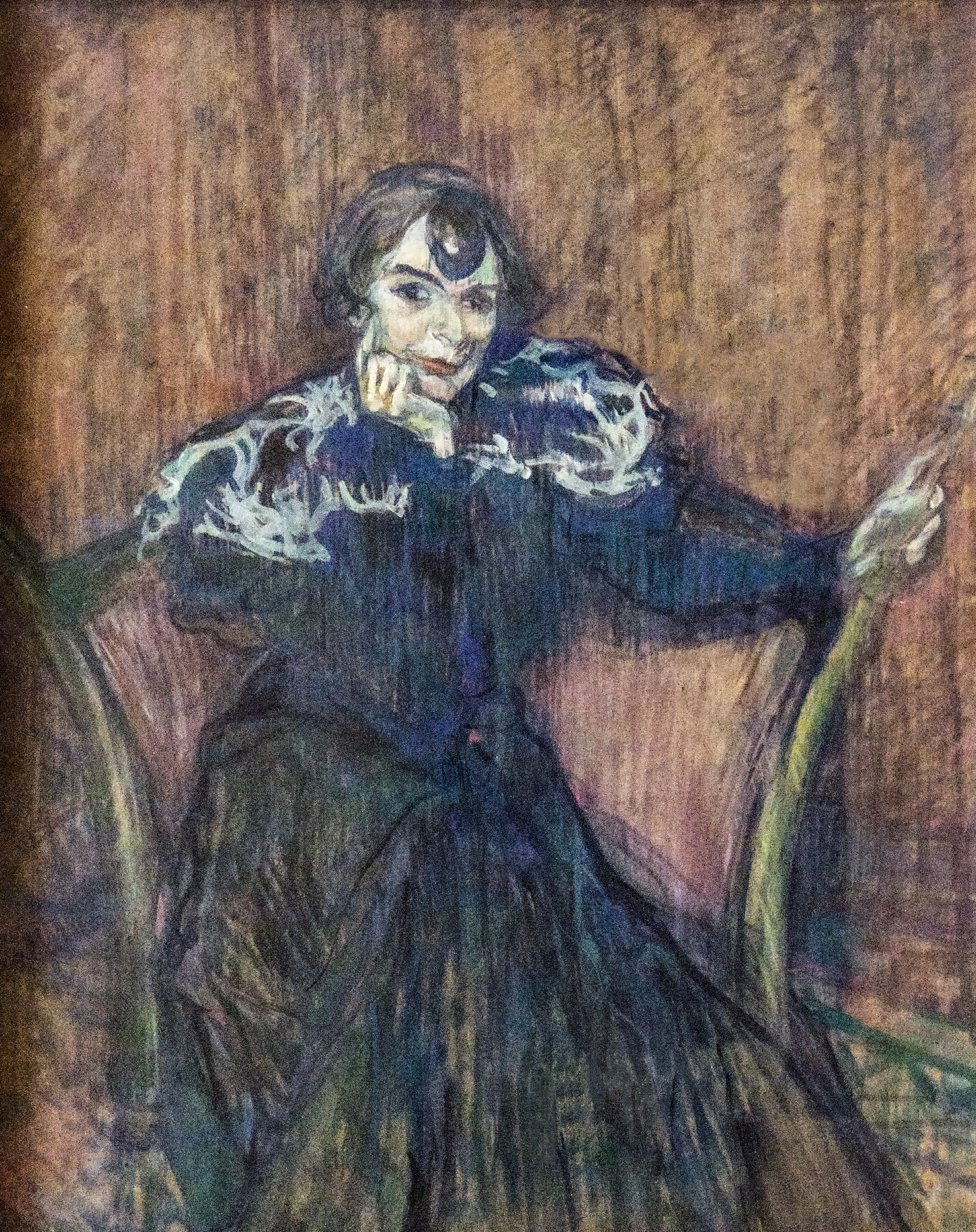
1897 portrait by Toulouse Lautrec

Berthe Bady was born in Lodelinsart, Belgium. She was educated at the Convent of the Sacred Heart of Dour, and then enrolled at the Brussels Conservatory in 1891, before joining the Vaudeville Theater in 1894. She accompanied Lugné-Poe in founding the Théâtre de l'Œuvre (Theatre of the Work). She was Henry Bataille's muse. She played at the Théâtre de l'Odéon Theatre from 1901 to 1904. Fernand Crommelynck dedicated his play, Les Amants puérils (Youthful Lovers) to her.

Bady died at Jouy-sur-Eure in northern France. Louis Aragon evokes her death in Blanche ou l'oubli.

== Notable performances ==
=== Theatre ===
- 1893 : Rosmersholm by Henrik Ibsen, directed by Lugné-Poe; performing Théâtre de l'Œuvre at the Théâtre des Bouffes du Nord
- 1894 : La Belle au bois dormant (The Sleeping Beauty) by Robert d'Humières and Henry Bataille, directed by Lugné-Poe
- 1894 : Annabella (adaptation by Maurice Maeterlinck of John Ford's 'Tis Pity She's a Whore), directed by Lugné-Poe
- 1894 : Une Nuit d'avril à Céos by Gabriel Trarieux, directed by Lugné Poe; performing Théâtre de l'Œuvre at Théâtre des Bouffes du Nord
- 1894 : Au-dessus des forces humaines (adaptation by Maurice Prozor of Bjørnstjerne Bjørnson's Over ævne), directed by Lugné-Poe
- 1894 : L'Image by Maurice Beaubourg. Directed by Lugné Poe; performing Théâtre de l'Œuvre at Theatre des Bouffes du Nord
- 1894 : La Vie muette by Maurice Beaubourg; staging Lugné Poe; performing Théâtre de l'Œuvre
- 1895 : Le Cuivre (Copper) by Paul Adam, directed by André Antoine
- 1902 : Résurrection (adapted from Leo Tolstoy's Resurrection) by Henry Bataille at the Odéon-Théâtre de l'Europe
- 1903 : L'Idiot by André de Lorde at the Odéon-Théâtre de l'Europe
- 1904 : Maman Colibri by Henry Bataille at the Vaudeville Theatre
- 1907 : Florise of Théodore de Banville to the Odéon-Théâtre de l'Europe
- 1910 : La Vierge folle (The Foolish Virgin) by Henry Bataille, Théâtre du Gymnase
- 1911 : La Femme nue by Henry Bataille at Théâtre de la Porte Saint-Martin
- 1913 : Le Chèvrefeuille by Gabriele D'Annunzio
- 1913 : L'Enchantement by Henry Bataille at Théâtre du Gymnase

=== Film ===
- 1918 : Ecce Homo (Behold [the] man) by Abel Gance, with the danseuse-mime Dourga
