= Eva Steininger-Bludau =

German politician (1951–2022)

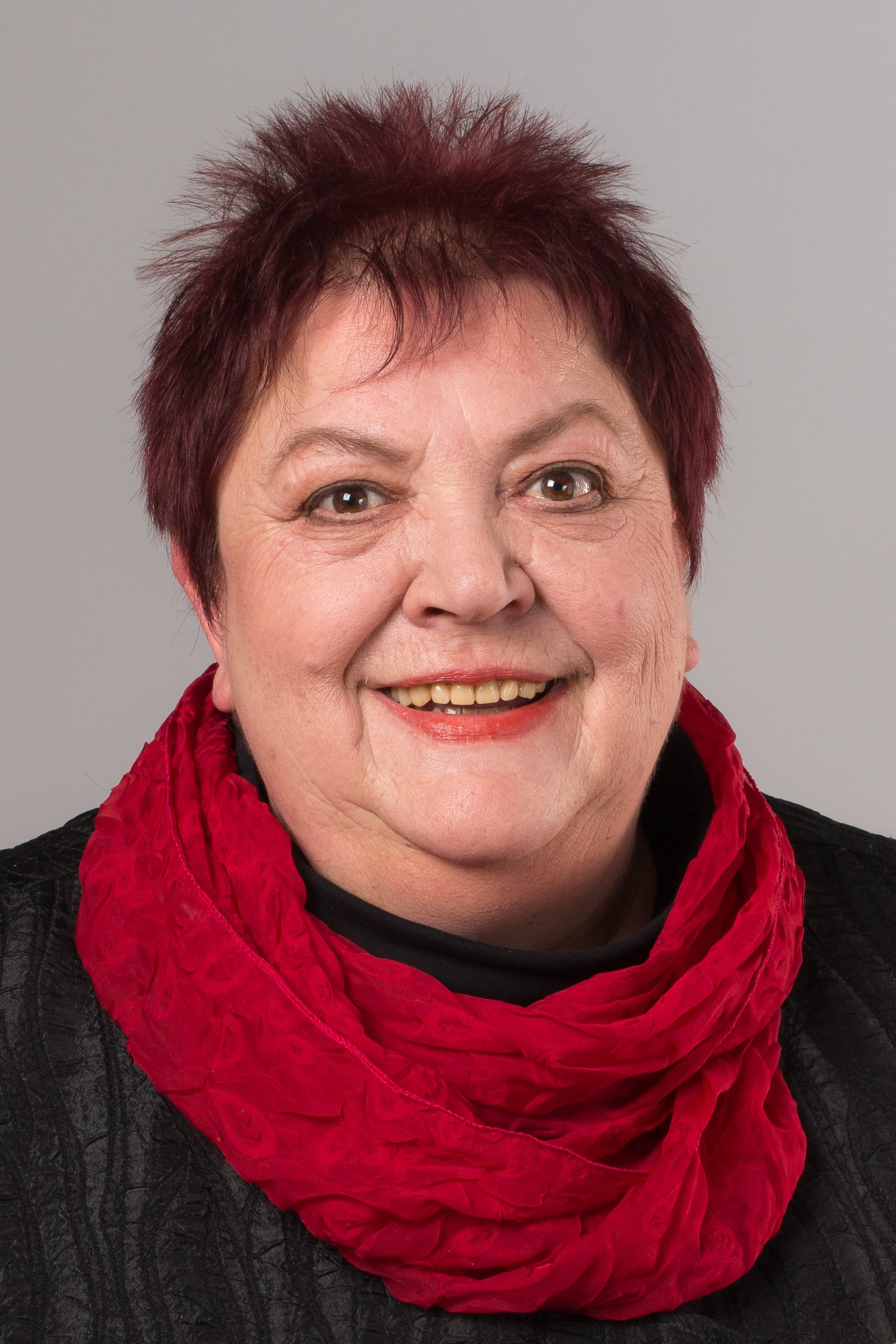
- Steininger-Bludau in 2013

Member of the Landtag of North Rhine-Westphalia
- In office 9 June 2010 – 31 May 2017

Personal details
- Born: 21 July 1951 Castrop-Rauxel, North Rhine-Westphalia, West Germany
- Died: 9 June 2022 (aged 70)
- Party: SPD

Eva Steininger-Bludau (21 July 1951 – 9 June 2022) was a German politician.

A member of the Social Democratic Party of Germany, she served in the Landtag of North Rhine-Westphalia from 2010 to 2017.

Steininger-Bludau died on 9 June 2022 at the age of 70.
