= Classification of localities and their parts in Poland =

According to the national law, settlement units or localities (Polish: miejscowość) are broadly classified in Poland as one of the following:

a) a principal locality (miejscowość podstawowa) - an independent locality, e.g. a city/town or a village, all of them are always principal localities, and
b) a part of a locality (część miejscowości) - an officially named, non-independent integral part of a city/town, a village or other principal locality, distinguished from other parts of the principal locality by a separate name or type - e.g. a quarter (dzielnica), always an integral part of a city or a town

Some of the types, namely a settlement, a colony, a neighbourhood and a hamlet, can be either a principal locality (rural only) or a part of a locality, the latter within any rural or urban principal locality in the case of a settlement, within a city/town or a village in the case of a colony and a neighbourhood, or within a village only in the case of a hamlet.

== Statistics by type ==
In 2015 there was 103,086 official names of localities and their parts, including (23 types):

- 915 names of cities and towns (miasto); see list of cities and towns in Poland for their subtypes,

6,710 names of parts of cities or towns (część miasta), usually quarters (dzielnica) or neighbourhoods (osiedle), sometimes also settlements (osada miejska) or colonies (kolonia miejska); other locally defined types are also allowed in cities and towns along those named in the national law, through these are rare,

- 43,069 names of villages (wieś),

36,262 names of parts of villages (część wsi),
520 names of settlements of villages (osada wsi),
974 names of colonies of villages (kolonia wsi),
224 names of forest settlements of villages (osada leśna wsi),
5 names of neighbourhoods of villages (osiedle wsi),
4,619 names of hamlets of villages (przysiółek wsi),

- 5,132 names of settlements (osada),

10 names of parts of settlements (część osady),
3 names of settlements of settlements (osada osady),
6 names of colonies of settlements (kolonia osady),
56 names of hamlets of settlements (przysiółek osady),

- 2,203 names of colonies (kolonia),

200 names of parts of colonies (część kolonii),
0 names of settlements of colonies (osada kolonii),
11 names of colonies of colonies (kolonia kolonii),
41 names of hamlets of colonies (przysiółek kolonii),

- 1,966 names of forest settlements (osada leśna),
- 5 names of neighbourhoods (osiedle),
- 133 names of hamlets (przysiółek),
- 22 names of tourist refuges (schronisko turystyczne).

Thus, there are 53,445 of independent localities, called principal localities (8 types: "urban" - cities/towns, "rural" - villages, settlements, colonies, forest settlements, neighbourhoods, hamlets and tourist refuges) and 49,641 of non-independent localities which are integral parts of principal localities (15 types: "urban" - parts of cities and towns, "rural" - parts of villages, settlements of villages, colonies of villages, forest settlements of villages, neighbourhoods of villages, hamlets of villages, parts of settlements, settlements of settlements, colonies of settlements, hamlets of settlements, parts of colonies, settlements of colonies, colonies of colonies and hamlets of colonies).

A statistical locality (miejscowość statystyczna) is a separated collection of several localities (out of all 23 types) for statistical purposes, for which statistical data are collected and compiled together. In a special case, the team may contain only one locality. There are two types of statistical localities:

I - city/town (miasto) including one "urban" principal locality and their integral parts, and
II - rural locality (miejscowość wiejska) including at least one "rural" principal locality and their integral parts.

In 2011 there was 42,490 of statistical localities. Thus, a large number (approx. 11,000) of the "rural" principal localities is taken together under the statistical localities (however, this data do not stipulate how many of tham are fully uninhabited).

Statistical localities size	Number	Population
1,000,000	1	1,700,612
500,000	4	2,671,330
200,000	12	3,518,990
100,000	22	3,009,265
50,000	47	3,206,433
20,000	136	4,297,334
10,000	188	2,748,473
5,000	247	1,694,912
2,000	1,002	2,940,490
1,000	2,086	2,843,085
500	4,982	3,445,440
200	13,558	4,256,516
100	11,034	1,608,450
0	9,171	570,494
Total	42,490	38,511,824
