= Elbląg County =

Elbląg County Powiat elbląski
- County
- Flag Coat of arms

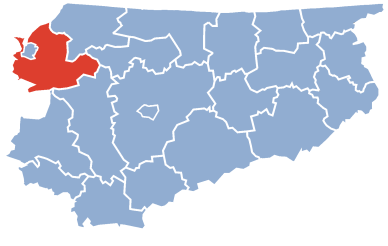
- Location within the voivodeship

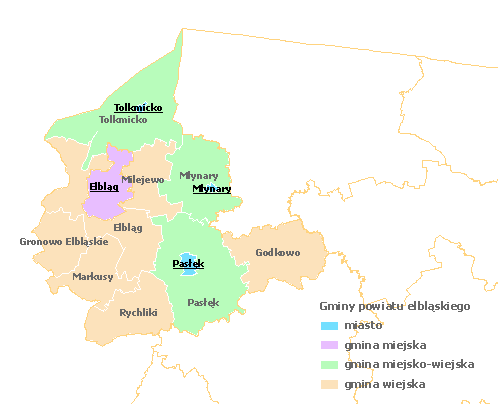
- Division into gminas
- Coordinates (Elbląg): 54°5′40″N 19°24′15″E
- Country: Poland
- Voivodeship: Warmian-Masurian
- Seat: Elbląg
- Gminas: Total 9: Gmina Elbląg; Gmina Godkowo; Gmina Gronowo Elbląskie; Gmina Markusy; Gmina Milejewo; Gmina Młynary; Gmina Pasłęk; Gmina Rychliki; Gmina Tolkmicko

Area
  - Total: 1,430.55 km^{2} (552.34 sq mi)

Population (2019)
  - Total: 57,395
  - Density: 40.121/km^{2} (103.91/sq mi)
  - Urban: 16,621
  - Rural: 40,774
- Car plates: NEB
- Website: www.powiat.elblag.pl

Elbląg County (Polish: powiat elbląski) is a unit of territorial administration and local government (powiat) in Warmian-Masurian Voivodeship, northern Poland. It came into being on January 1, 1999, as a result of the Polish local government reforms passed in 1998. Its administrative seat is the city of Elbląg, although the city is not part of the county (it constitutes a separate city county). The county contains three towns: Pasłęk, 18 km (11 mi) east of Elbląg, Tolkmicko, 27 km (17 mi) north of Elbląg, and Młynary, 24 km (15 mi) north-east of Elbląg.

The county covers an area of 1,430.55 square kilometres (552.3 sq mi). In 2019, its total population was 57,395, of which the population of Pasłęk was 12,160, that of Tolkmicko was 2,689, that of Młynary was 1,772, and the rural population was 40,774.

== Neighbouring counties ==
Apart from the city of Elbląg, Elbląg County is also bordered by Braniewo County to the north-east, Lidzbark County to the east, Ostróda County to the south-east, Sztum County to the south-west, Malbork County and Nowy Dwór County to the west and the Vistula Lagoon to the north-west.

== Administrative divisions ==
The county is subdivided into nine gminas (three urban-rural and six rural). These are listed in the following table, in descending order of population.

Gmina	Type	Area (km^{2})	Population (2019)	Seat
Gmina Pasłęk	Urban-rural	264.4	19,337	Pasłęk
Gmina Elbląg	Rural	192.1	7,524	Elbląg *
Gmina Tolkmicko	Urban-rural	225.3	6,643	Tolkmicko
Gmina Gronowo Elbląskie	Rural	89.2	5,135	Gronowo Elbląskie
Gmina Młynary	Urban-rural	157.1	4,419	Młynary
Gmina Markusy	Rural	108.6	4,075	Markusy
Gmina Rychliki	Rural	131.7	3,811	Rychliki
Gmina Milejewo	Rural	95.6	3,414	Milejewo
Gmina Godkowo	Rural	166.7	3,037	Godkowo
* seat not part of the gmina
