= Thematic village =

Thematic villages (Polish: wioski tematyczne) are small tourist villages formed from a need to generate an alternative source of income and foster a feeling of community and pride in declining rural areas.

== Austria ==
The idea of thematic villages began in 1984 using four municipalities as test communities. With the success of those communities the non-profit Lower Austrian Village and Urban Renewal Project was founded in 1990 to motivate the population to participate actively in their villages, towns, and cities. By 2010 village redevelopment activities were implemented from 1341 locations.

Examples of thematic villages:

- Krummnußbaum - Nut Village
- Purgstall an der Erlauf - Book Village
- Armschlag - Poppy Village
- Herrnbaumgarten - Nonsense Village

== Poland ==
Seeing the success of the Austrian villages, Poland followed with their first thematic villages 15 years later.

=== West Pomeranian Voivodeship ===
The first Polish thematic villages, mostly geared towards children of school age, were established in this voivodeship. They include: Dąbrowa, the Village of Healthy Living; Iwiecino, the Village of the End of the World; Paproty, the Village of Labyrinths and Sources; the Fairytale and Fun Fair in Podgórke; and the Tolkien-inspired Hobbit Village, Sierakowo Sławieńskie.

=== Podlaskie Voivodeship ===
The District Office in Białystok and the County Office in Suwałki promoted the idea of thematic villages in this voivodship starting November 2008. This endeavor is co-financed by the EU.

- Ruda - Adventure Bread Village
- Krypno - Pacowa Cottage Hamlet
- Góra - Rybia Mountain
- Czarna Wieś Kościelna - Forest Spirit Village
- Obrubniki - Slav's Land
- Janowszczyzna - A Village with Traditions
- Dzięciołówka - Strawberry Village

=== Lesser Poland Voivodeship ===
- Dulowa - Lost Village
- Głogoczów - Sport and Family Village
- Ruda Kameralna - Positively Twisted Village

=== Opolskie Voivodeship ===
- Kuniów - Agritourism Village
- Kujakowice Górne - Crumb Cake Village
- Maciejów - Village of Flowing Honey
- Pawłowice - Village of Paradise

=== Kuyavian-Pomeranian Voivodeship ===
- Adamkowo - Avian Village
- Gzin - Rituals Village
- Jabłonka - Apple Village
- Jania Góra - Bread Village
- Krzywogoniec - Mushroom Village
- Macikowo - Herbal Village
- Nowy Sumin - Borovian Village
- Piła-Młyn - Coal Mining Village
- Podzamek Golubski - Village of Nuts
- Węgiersk - Fruit Village
- Wielki Mędromierz - Honey Village
- Wylatowo - Village of UFOs
- Wysoka - Cypress Village
- Żalno - Flower Village

=== Łódź Voivodeship ===
- Stara Wieś - Karate Village
- Domaniew - Artistic Village

=== Świętokrzyskie Voivodeship ===
- Bałtów - Dinosaur Park

=== Pomeranian Voivodeship ===
- Karwno - Fantasy Village

=== Podkarpackie Voivodeship ===
- Kuńkowce - Living Fantasy Village

=== Warmian-Masurian Voivodeship ===
- Suchacz - Kaperska Village
- Pogrodzie - Children's Village
- Kadyny - Imperial Village
- Aniołowo - Angels Village

== Germany ==
- Bröbberow - Mecklenburg Culture
- Nattenheim - Village of Witches
- Ingenried - Village of Renewable Energy
- Malzhausen - Country Village

== See also ==
- Tourist village (Indonesia)
- Ethnographic village
