= Brzeziński =

Brzeziński (feminine: Brzezińska, plural: Brzezińscy) is a Polish surname.

== History ==
The surname is derived from the root word "brzoza" ("brzez-" in some compound words), meaning "birch". The adjective suffix "-ski" means "being like" or "belonging to", so Brzeziński refers to a person from one of the localities named for a concentration of birch trees, such as Brzezina, (a small village in Western Pomerania). In Polish, Brzeziński has a diacritic over the letter "ń", and the Polish pronunciation is "bzhe-ZEEGN-ski" (where GN sounds like the NI of "onion").

The Brzeziński surname was originally borne only by the szlachta, the Polish noble class, who took their names from their estates, but it later spread to the working and peasant classes as well. It is known to be associated with at least nine different coats of arms:

- Dołęga coat of arms (originating in eastern Poland)
- Doliwa coat of arms (originating in Łęczyca)
- Gryf coat of arms (borne by the two Brzeziński families ennobled by the Tsar in his role as "King of Poland" in the 19th century)
- Kościesza coat of arms
- Łabędź coat of arms (originating in Sandomierz)
- Lubicz coat of arms (originating in Płock)
- Prus III coat of arms
- Trąby coat of arms (originating in Kraków)
- Zabawa coat of arms

There were 25,361 persons with the name Brzeziński in Poland in 1990. The name has been borne by many notable Poles and persons of Polish descent, including:

== People ==
=== In Poland ===
- Adam Brzeziński (1768–after 1797), Polish ballet dancer
- Adrian Brzeziński (born 1998), Polish sprinter and long jumper
- Anna Brzezińska (disambiguation), several people
- Bogumił Brzezinski (born 1943), Polish chemist and professor
- Ewelina Brzezińska (born 1988), Polish volleyball player
- Marcin Brzeziński (born 1984), Polish rower
- Patryk Brzeziński (born 1984), Polish rower
- Tadeusz Brzeziński (1896–1990), Polish diplomat and soldier
- Wacław Brzeziński (1878–1955), Polish baritone singer

=== In other countries ===
- David W. Brzezinski (born 1976), American college professor and author
- Doug Brzezinski (born 1976), American football player
- Emilie Benes Brzezinski (1932–2022), American sculptor, wife of Zbigniew Brzezinski
- Ian Brzezinski (born 1963), American foreign policy and defense expert, son of Zbigniew Brzezinski
- Mark Brzezinski (born 1965), American lawyer and diplomat, son of Zbigniew Brzezinski
- Matthew Brzezinski (born 1965), author and journalist, son of Lech Brzeziński
- Mika Brzezinski (born 1967), American TV news anchor, daughter of Zbigniew Brzezinski
- Rob Brzezinski, American football executive
- Zbigniew Brzezinski (1928–2017) American foreign policy expert, son of Tadeusz Brzeziński

== See also ==
- 19563 Brzezinska, a minor planet
