= Brzezina =

Brzezina may refer to the following places in Poland:

- Brzezina, Milicz County in Lower Silesian Voivodeship (south-west Poland)
- Brzezina, Oleśnica County in Lower Silesian Voivodeship (south-west Poland)
- Brzezina, Gmina Miękinia in Środa County, Lower Silesian Voivodeship (south-west Poland)
- Brzezina, Podlaskie Voivodeship (north-east Poland)
- Brzezina, Greater Poland Voivodeship (west-central Poland)
- Brzezina, Silesian Voivodeship (south Poland)
- Brzezina, Brzeg County in Opole Voivodeship (south-west Poland)
- Brzezina, Krapkowice County in Opole Voivodeship (south-west Poland)
- Brzezina, Strzelce County in Opole Voivodeship (south-west Poland)
- Brzezina, Warmian-Masurian Voivodeship (north Poland)
- Brzezina, West Pomeranian Voivodeship (north-west Poland)
- Bzezina, a film by Polish director Andrzej Wajda
