= Gałczewo =

- Location within Poland
- Coordinates: 53°09′33″N 19°03′20″E
- Country: Poland
- Voivodeship: Kuyavian-Pomeranian
- County: Golub-Dobrzyń
- Gmina: Golub-Dobrzyń
- Time zone: UTC+1 (CET)
  - Summer (DST): UTC+2 (CEST)
- Postal code: 87-400
- Climate: Cfb

Gałczewo (Polish: [ɡau̯ˈt͡ʂɛ.vɔ]) is a village in Kuyavian-Pomeranian Voivodeship, Poland, located in the municipality of Golub-Dobrzyń, within Golub-Dobrzyń County.
