= Cieszków =

- Village
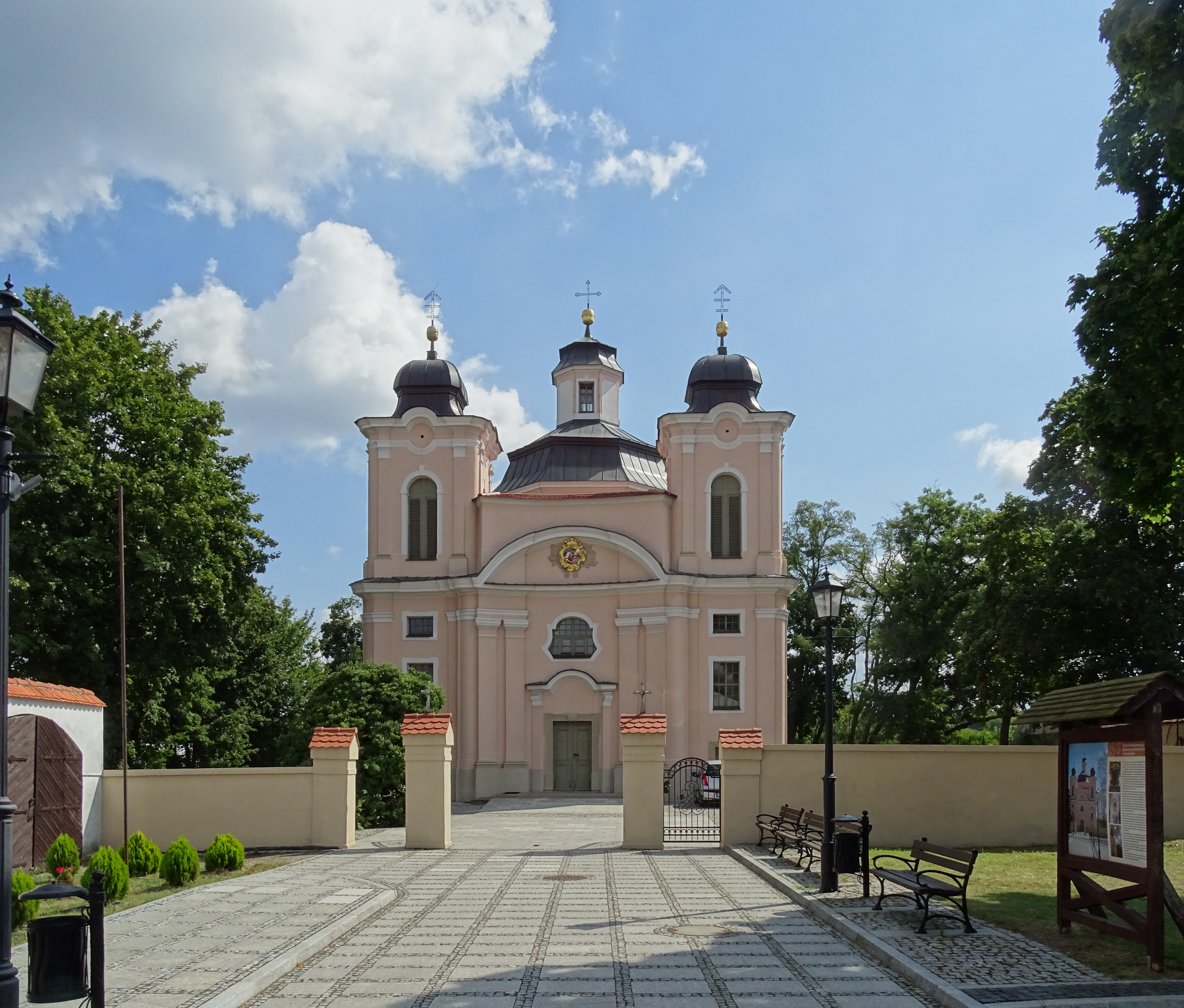
- Parish church of the Assumption

- Location within Poland
- Coordinates: 51°38′N 17°21′E
- Country: Poland
- Voivodeship: Lower Silesian
- County: Milicz
- Gmina: Cieszków

Population
  - Total: 1,800
- Time zone: UTC+1 (CET)
  - Summer (DST): UTC+2 (CEST)
- Vehicle registration: DMI
- Website: http://www.cieszkow.pl

Cieszków ([ˈt͡ɕɛʂkuf]) is a village in Milicz County, Lower Silesian Voivodeship, in western Poland. It is the seat of the administrative district (gmina) called Gmina Cieszków.

The local landmark is the Baroque Church of the Assumption, built by Polish noblewoman Katarzyna Agnieszka Ludwika Sapieha in c. 1753.

There is a railway station in Cieszków.

== History ==
Following the Prussian conquest of 1742 the village came under German rule (first by Prussia, after 1871 the nation-state of Germany). Its German name was Freyhan. At the end of the Second World War in 1945, the region of Silesia to which the village belongs was transferred to Poland, and the German-speaking inhabitants of the region were forced to flee. The village since then has been fully Polish in ethnicity and goes solely by the Polish name of Cieszków.
