= Suchacz =

- Village
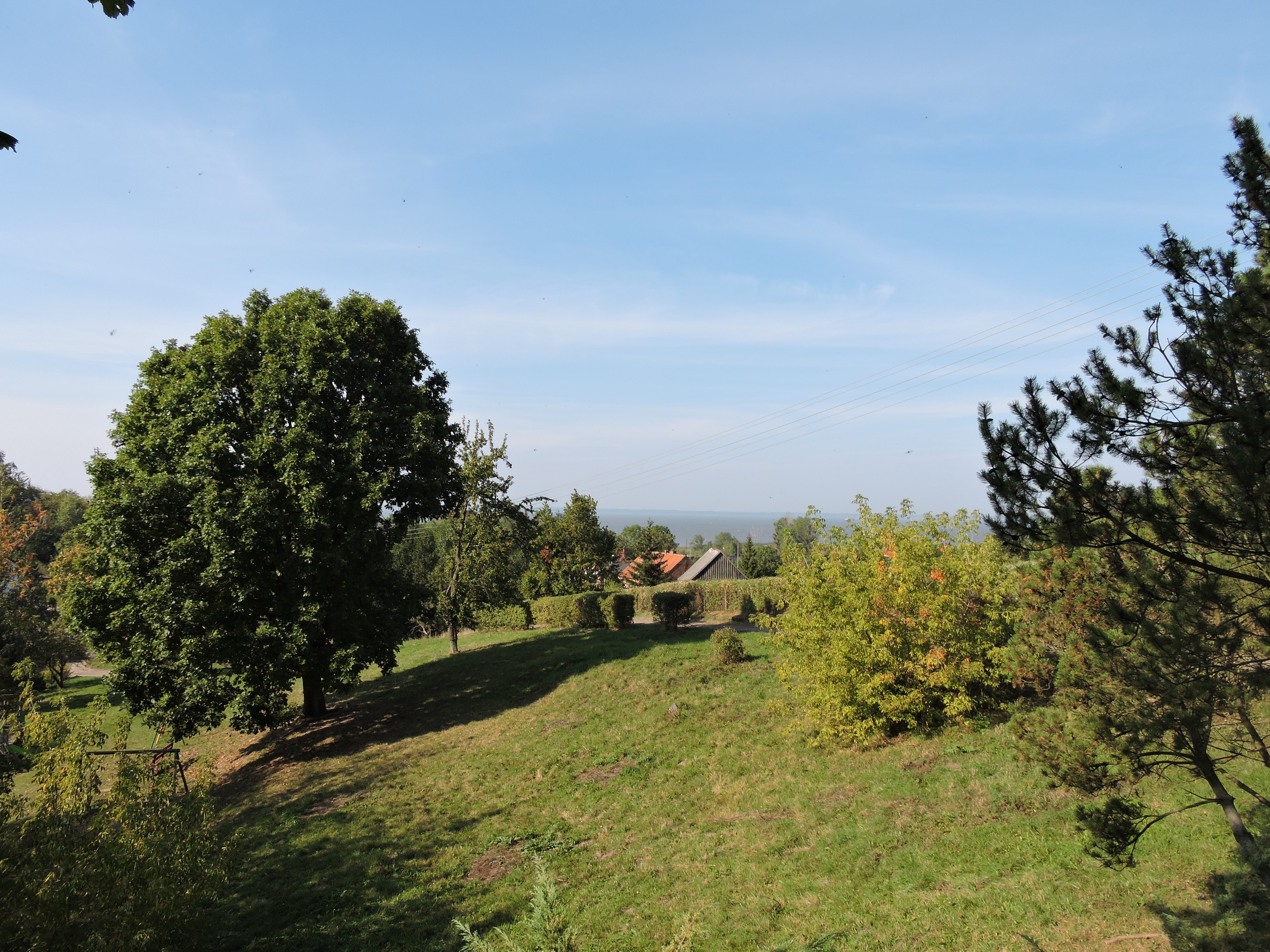

- Location within Poland
- Coordinates: 54°17′4″N 19°26′17″E
- Country: Poland
- Voivodeship: Warmian-Masurian
- County: Elbląg
- Gmina: Tolkmicko
- Population (2010): 854
- Time zone: UTC+1 (CET)
  - Summer (DST): UTC+2 (CEST)
- Vehicle registration: NEB

Suchacz [ˈsuxat͡ʂ] is a village in the administrative district of Gmina Tolkmicko, within Elbląg County, Warmian-Masurian Voivodeship, in northern Poland.

== Etymology ==
The name Succase probably derives from the Old Prussian term suckis for "fish". In view of this, it is assumed that the place was settled by Prussian fishermen until the time of the Teutonic Order. The settlement was also recorded with the name Sucase or Suckase. On a map issued from Amsterdam in 1640, Swedish cartographer Olao Ioannis Gotho named the settlement Fischerbud (= German: fishing lodge).

== History ==
A late Neolithic settlement from around 2000–1700 BC existed at the site.

In the course of the High Medieval German colonisation of the East (Ostsiedlung) in the 13th and 14th century and the simultaneous conquest of the Prussian region by the Teutonic Order, ethnic Germans migrated to the region, and the original Prussian population was gradually and finally completely Germanised. In the course of the Thirteen Years' War, the Battle of Vistula Lagoon between the navy of the Teutonic Order, and the navy of the Prussian Confederation which was allied with the King of Poland took place near Succase in 1463. This event is commemorated by a monument in today's village.

Due to the defeat of the Teutonic Order in the Thirteen Years' War (1454–1466) against the Prussian Confederation and the Polish king allied with it, Succase was under the sovereignty of the Polish Crown between 1466 and 1772 as part of Royal Prussia and must soon have been annexed by the latter to the territory of the autonomous city republic of Elbing as a donation. Succase was under the jurisdiction of Elbing when it was first mentioned by name in 1570 in the course of a dispute between the captain of Tolkemit and the Elbing council. The document further testifies that there was hardly more than an inn in the place at that time. Only gradually, in the course of time, a few smaller houses were added, whose inhabitants lived mainly from fishing.

After the First Partition of Poland in 1772, Succase belonged to the Prussian province of West Prussia, and thus to the German Empire since 1871. In 1773, the Elbing magistrate, who was still responsible for Succase, determined that the inhabitants were not to be conscripted into forced labour, but only into woodcutting in the municipal forests.

In the 19th century, the village grew increasingly, due to the ceramic industry. After schooling had previously taken place in Lenzen, it now became necessary to establish a school in the village itself. In 1838, the community bought a croft that was under construction and set it up as a school building. In autumn 1838, the school building was inaugurated by the Lenzen pastor Simon Gottwerth Plehwe.

Besides fishing, work in the local brickyard was one of the residents' sources of income. In the second half of the 19th century, the village received a second inn. With the opening of the Haffufer railway line in 1899, which connected Succase with Elbing and with Braunsberg, the village advanced to become a place of excursions, especially for the people of Elbing, where a beach life established itself in the summer. Fruit-growing also gained in importance, and the Haff coast developed into the fruit chamber of East and West Prussia. Thus the village expanded more and more, and the population grew steadily. In the cherry season, the Succasians shipped the fruit on their barges all the way to Königsberg. Between 1919 and 1921, a road was built to connect Succase with Elbing and Tolkemit. In 1925 Succase had 623 inhabitants.

After the Second World War, Succase became Polish, the German population was expelled and the village was now called Suchacz. However, the village was soon able to regain its status as an excursion destination, especially as the former Haffufer Railway soon resumed operation as Linia kolejowa nr 254. In the 1970s there was still a restaurant, camping site, recreation centre of the Polish State Railway (PKP), bathing beach, etc. Towards the end of the 20th century, the decline set in. In the 80's and 90's the place was run down. In 2005 the Linia kolejowa nr 254 ceased operation. But the first signs of another upswing are becoming apparent: In 2004, a marina was established in Suchacz, which could soon gain in importance when the Vistula Spit canal is opened.
