= Józef Wojtan =

Polish operatic singer

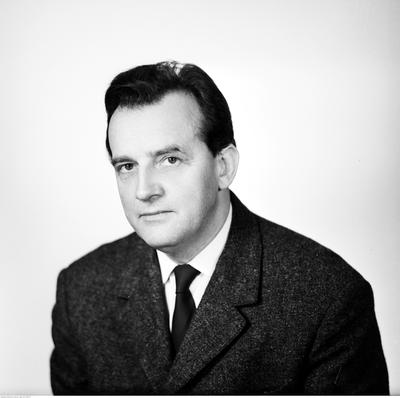
Józef Wojtan

Józef Wojtan (January 20, 1922 – March 16, 2007) was a Polish opera singer (baritone).

== Biography ==
Wojtan was born in Słupca, Poland. His family moved to Łódź, when Wojtan was seven. He graduated from the Academy of Music in Łódź (Grzegorz Orlow's class, and later with professor Wacław Brzeziński). From 1950 to 1951 worked as an actor at the Teatr Dramatyczny in Częstochowa, Poland. He became a soloist-singer at the National Opera of Poland in 1953. In 1961 he moved to Grand Theatre, Warsaw, where he worked until 1976.

Patriotic and military songs were important part of Wojtan's repertoire; during 1960s and 1970s he performed as a soloist for Central Artistic Ensemble of the Polish Army.

He died in Warsaw, in March 2007.
