= Kikoły, Warmian–Masurian Voivodeship =

Kikoły
- Settlement
- Location within Poland
- Coordinates: 54°18′18″N 19°30′19″E
- Country: Poland
- Voivodeship: Warmian-Masurian
- County: Elbląg
- Gmina: Tolkmicko
- Population (2012): 52
- Time zone: UTC+1 (CET)
  - Summer (DST): UTC+2 (CEST)
- Vehicle registration: NEB

Kikoły [kiˈkɔwɨ] is a settlement part of the village of Kadyny, in the administrative district of Gmina Tolkmicko, within Elbląg County, Warmian-Masurian Voivodeship, in northern Poland.

A watermill was erected in the settlement in 1347, it was repeatedly destroyed and rebuilt throughout history, and Kikoły developed into a land estate in the 18th century. After the First Partition of Poland in 1772 the settlement was annexed by Prussia, and the mill and estate were nationalized by the Prussians. From 1871 to 1945 it formed part of Germany (within the province of East Prussia), before it became part of Poland again after Nazi Germany's defeat in World War II.
