= Duża Kujawa =

- Village
- Location within Poland
- Coordinates: 53°11′2″N 19°10′46″E
- Country: Poland
- Voivodeship: Kuyavian-Pomeranian
- County: Golub-Dobrzyń
- Gmina: Golub-Dobrzyń
- Population: 130

Duża Kujawa [ˈduʐa kuˈjava] is a village in the administrative district of Gmina Golub-Dobrzyń, within Golub-Dobrzyń County, Kuyavian-Pomeranian Voivodeship, in north-central Poland.
