= Pęklewo =

- Settlement
- Location within Poland
- Coordinates: 54°17′26″N 19°27′37″E
- Country: Poland
- Voivodeship: Warmian-Masurian
- County: Elbląg
- Gmina: Tolkmicko

Pęklewo [pɛnˈklɛvɔ] is a settlement in the administrative district of Gmina Tolkmicko, within Elbląg County, Warmian-Masurian Voivodeship, in northern Poland.
