= Gmina Tolkmicko =

Gmina Tolkmicko Tolkmicko Commune
- Gmina
- Coat of arms
- Interactive map of Gmina Tolkmicko
- Coordinates (Tolkmicko): 54°19′14″N 19°31′50″E
- Country: Poland
- Voivodeship: Warmian-Masurian
- County: Elbląg County
- Seat: Tolkmicko

Area
  - Total: 225.3 km^{2} (87.0 sq mi)

Population (2006)
  - Total: 6,670
  - Density: 29.6/km^{2} (76.7/sq mi)
  - Urban: 2,731
  - Rural: 3,939
- Website: http://www.tolkmicko.pl

Gmina Tolkmicko is an urban-rural gmina (administrative district) in Elbląg County, Warmian-Masurian Voivodeship, in northern Poland. Its seat is the town of Tolkmicko, which lies approximately 27 kilometres (17 mi) north of Elbląg and 87 km (54 mi) north-west of the regional capital Olsztyn.

The gmina covers an area of 225.3 square kilometres (87.0 sq mi), and as of 2006 its total population is 6,670 (out of which the population of Tolkmicko amounts to 2,731, and the population of the rural part of the gmina is 3,939).

The gmina contains part of the protected area called Elbląg Upland Landscape Park.

== Villages ==
Apart from the town of Tolkmicko, Gmina Tolkmicko contains the villages and settlements of Biała Leśniczówka, Bogdaniec, Brzezina, Chojnowo, Janówek, Kadyny, Kamienica Elbląska, Kamionek Wielki, Kikoły, Łęcze, Nadbrzeże, Nowinka, Ostrogóra, Pagórki, Pęklewo, Pogrodzie, Połoniny, Przybyłowo, Przylesie, Rangóry, Suchacz, Święty Kamień, Wodynia and Wysoki Bór.

== Neighbouring gminas ==
Gmina Tolkmicko is bordered by the city of Elbląg and by the gminas of Elbląg, Frombork, Milejewo, Młynary and Sztutowo. It also lies next to the Vistula Lagoon.
