= Guzowice =

- Village
- Location within Poland
- Coordinates: 51°37′26″N 17°19′05″E
- Country: Poland
- Voivodeship: Lower Silesian
- County: Milicz
- Gmina: Cieszków

Guzowice [ɡuzɔˈvit͡sɛ] is a village in the administrative district of Gmina Cieszków, within Milicz County, Lower Silesian Voivodeship, in south-western Poland.
