= Trzebicko =

- Village
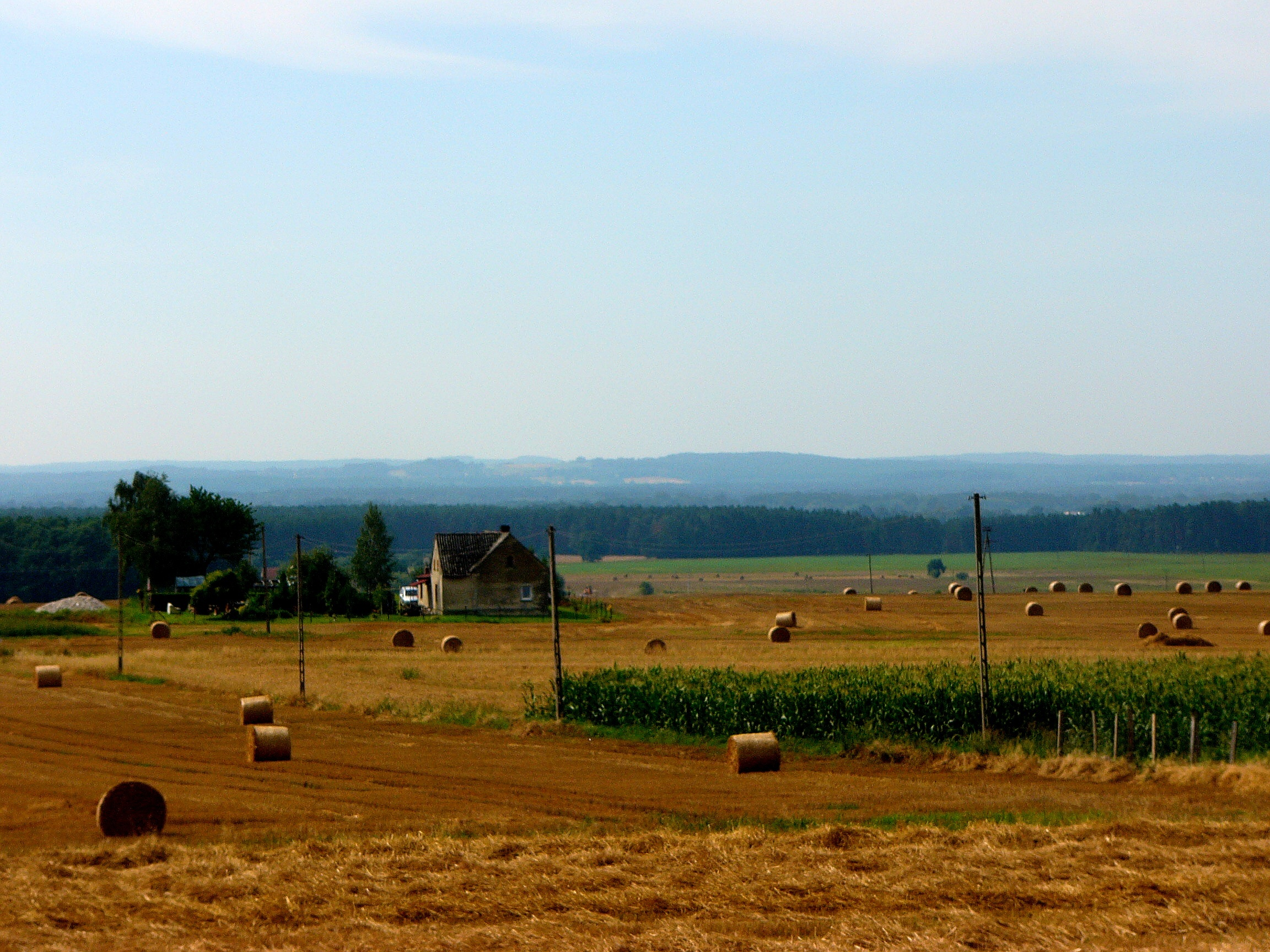

- Location within Poland
- Coordinates: 51°36′N 17°23′E
- Country: Poland
- Voivodeship: Lower Silesian
- County: Milicz
- Gmina: Cieszków

Trzebicko [tʂɛˈbit͡skɔ] is a village in the administrative district of Gmina Cieszków, within Milicz County, Lower Silesian Voivodeship, in south-western Poland.
