= Wężowice =

- Village
- Location within Poland
- Coordinates: 51°36′46″N 17°23′48″E
- Country: Poland
- Voivodeship: Lower Silesian
- County: Milicz
- Gmina: Cieszków

Wężowice [vɛ̃ʐɔˈvit͡sɛ] is a village in the administrative district of Gmina Cieszków, within Milicz County, Lower Silesian Voivodeship, in south-western Poland.
