= Bogdaniec, Warmian-Masurian Voivodeship =

Bogdaniec
- Settlement
- Location within Poland
- Coordinates: 54°16′34″N 19°27′10″E
- Country: Poland
- Voivodeship: Warmian-Masurian
- County: Elbląg
- Gmina: Tolkmicko

Bogdaniec [bɔɡˈdaɲɛt͡s] is a settlement in the administrative district of Gmina Tolkmicko, within Elbląg County, Warmian-Masurian Voivodeship, in northern Poland.
