= Nowy Folwark, Lower Silesian Voivodeship =

Nowy Folwark
- Village
- Location within Poland
- Coordinates: 51°37′57″N 17°16′46″E
- Country: Poland
- Voivodeship: Lower Silesian
- County: Milicz
- Gmina: Cieszków

Nowy Folwark [ˈnɔvɨ ˈfɔlvark] is a village in the administrative district of Gmina Cieszków, within Milicz County, Lower Silesian Voivodeship, in south-western Poland.
