= Biała Leśniczówka =

- Settlement
- Location within Poland
- Coordinates: 54°17′39″N 19°30′52″E
- Country: Poland
- Voivodeship: Warmian-Masurian
- County: Elbląg
- Gmina: Tolkmicko

Biała Leśniczówka (Polish pronunciation: [ˈbjawa lɛɕɲiˈtʂufka]) is a settlement in the administrative district of Gmina Tolkmicko, within Elbląg County, Warmian-Masurian Voivodeship, in northern Poland.
