= Góry, Lower Silesian Voivodeship =

Góry
- Village
- Location within Poland
- Coordinates: 51°35′59″N 17°21′22″E
- Country: Poland
- Voivodeship: Lower Silesian
- County: Milicz
- Gmina: Cieszków

Góry [ˈɡurɨ] is a village in the administrative district of Gmina Cieszków, within Milicz County, Lower Silesian Voivodeship, in south-western Poland.

The name of the village is of Polish origin and comes from the word góra which means "hill".
