= Chojnowo, Warmian-Masurian Voivodeship =

Chojnowo
- Village
- Location within Poland
- Coordinates: 54°18′39″N 19°36′7″E
- Country: Poland
- Voivodeship: Warmian-Masurian
- County: Elbląg
- Gmina: Tolkmicko

Chojnowo ([xɔi̯ˈnɔvɔ]; German: Konradswalde) is a village in the administrative district of Gmina Tolkmicko, within Elbląg County, Warmian-Masurian Voivodeship, in northern Poland.
