= Ostrowite, Golub-Dobrzyń County =

Ostrowite
- Village
- Location within Poland
- Coordinates: 53°8′35″N 18°59′1″E
- Country: Poland
- Voivodeship: Kuyavian-Pomeranian
- County: Golub-Dobrzyń
- Gmina: Golub-Dobrzyń

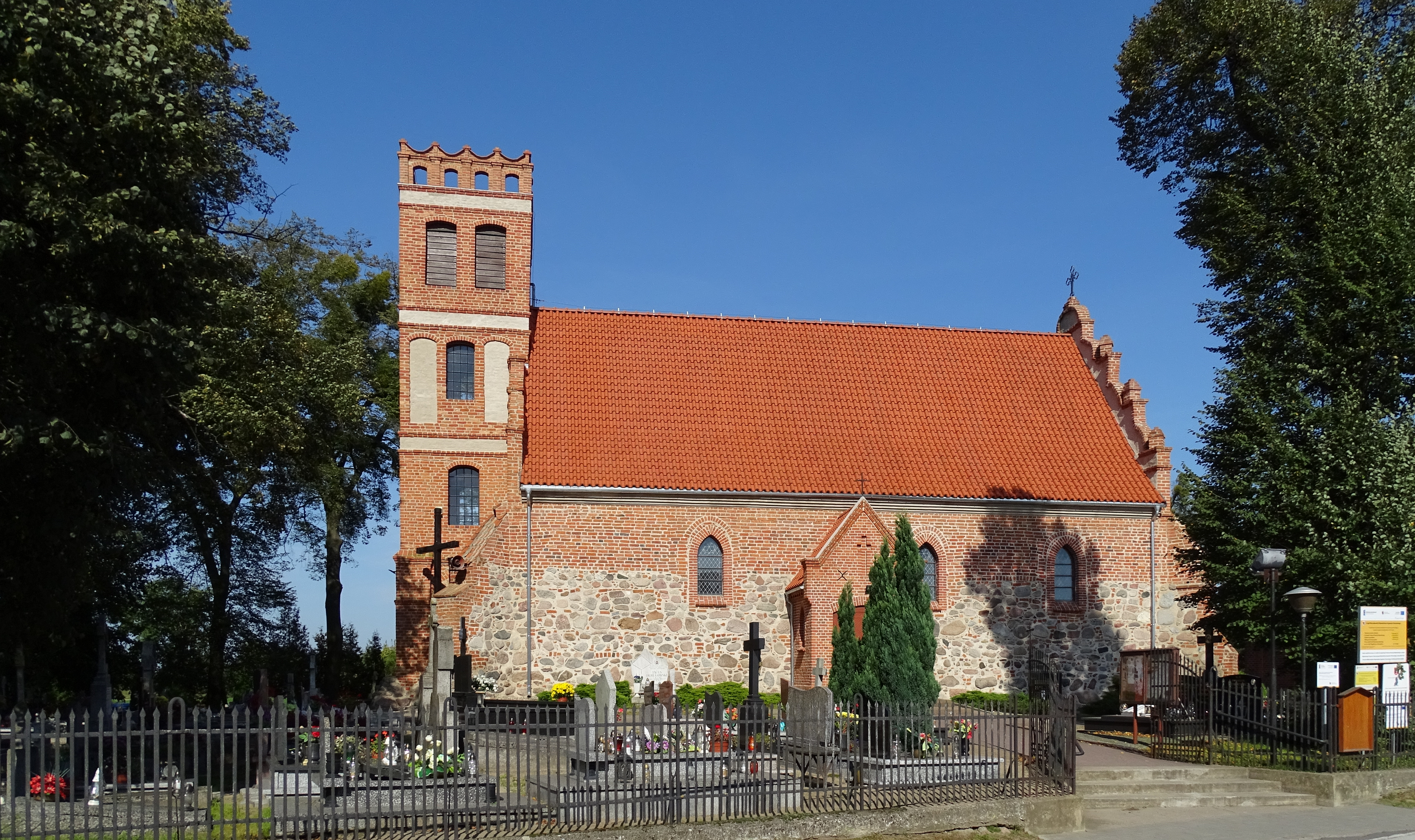
Church of Saint Mary Magdalene. Construction started in the 13th century.

Ostrowite [ɔstrɔˈvitɛ] is a village in the administrative district of Gmina Golub-Dobrzyń, within Golub-Dobrzyń County, Kuyavian-Pomeranian Voivodeship, in north-central Poland.

== History ==
=== Early history and the church ===
In 1875 Ostrowite had fifty buildings, including six made of brick and wood - the rest made of the clay, all with thatched roofs. The large church was one of its most important buildings, having been restored in 1739 and 1870. In the early 1900s, however, it was demolished. Only the temple stands today.

=== Industrialization and the cemetery ===
The rapid development of the construction industry in Ostrowite occurred in the years 1918 to 1939, then there already being brick houses and stoves. A more radical change took place 45 years later, and the last 30 years have undergone an explosion of construction. It is now nice, neat, and architecturally quite contemporary. However, there is much left of the almost two hundred years old monuments. One such monument is Ostrowitego. Ostrowitego is small, parish cemetery. The occupations of the parishioners there are still unknown, since 30– 50 years ago, many graves did not have subtitles. In this cemetery are three other monuments that are worth mentioning: two tombs of landowners, one of which was built in the mid-nineteenth century, the second at the end of it. It has been reported that there were four of these tombs, but only these two have survived. There is also a lovely family tomb of Tylmanowa. The most modern is that of Father Anthony Albina. Father Anthony Albina was an especially important priest; he oversaw the building of the church and the Parish House. Thanks to the efforts of the municipalities, money for the maintenance of these tombs has been found. At the moment, the Ostrowickiego cemetery is likely to remain for quite a while. With these tombs is often associated the World War two occupation. In 1940, the German occupiers threw many of the coffins on a pile and burned them. The cemetery was then transformed into a makeshift prison. Many Ostrowite inhabitants were kept there for several days and were often ill-treated before being exported to a prison camp in Inowrocław.

=== The old tavern ===
Perhaps the oldest - and certainly the longest inhabited - Ostrowitego building is an old tavern. At the beginning of the 1900s it was only an inn. Later on, however, it housed the Lewandowskich family's butchery, and now is the home of the Smuszkiewiczów family. At the time when Poland was under German occupation, Ostrowite was part of the border between Germany and Russia. During this time the old inn was used for smuggling. Those who were involved in the smuggling of alcohol and spirits used this inn. These were such lucrative jobs that it was the root of many a fortune in the community. However, smuggling was not considered reprehensible. Smugglers filled wooden barrels with one side flat, forming a sort of cake. A strong man took could carry forty liters, weaker men would carry up to twenty. Smugglers had to walk quite a few miles, and even cross the lake Powidzkie. Some made their way up to Mielżyna, because there they would transfer it across the border at the greatest profit.

=== The Parish House and Father Albina ===
Another important, but more modern, building is the Parish House, locally known as the organist. After Poland regained its independence in 1918, and censorship ceased, a place where the cultural life of the municipalities and the parish could flourish was greatly needed. On the initiative of the aforementioned parish priest, Father Albina, the construction of the house began. It was to be established as the home of the fire brigade, the organists, and as a shelter for those who had no place to live. With great commitment to the parish community, the house was built in the early 1920s. It was built with the remnants of building materials made available from the demolition of the larch church. In the house, as planned, was the headquarters of the fire brigade, and the ground floor was an auditorium where civil life flourished. It also held content of a both religious and secular nature, as well as extravagant balls and dances. This house contains thick larch beams of up hundreds of years old, thanks to the material from the church, and more recently constructed benches. For 39 years this house was the center of cultural and civic community.

=== Aviation and the Metal Tower ===
An important, though perhaps less spectacular, monument is the metal tower, a building that is perhaps unique in the country. Modern Ostrowicz (citizens of Ostrowite) know little about it, and when asked about its origin, generally say it was a vantage point for firefighters. In fact, the tower is connected with aviation. In the 1930s, there was rapid development of aviation communication and navigation equipment. The number of passenger aircraft at that time was rather low, and there was no radar or radar equipment. It was most difficult to fly at night. To deal with this, from the Polish - German border to Warsaw a whole chain of towers was created, acting as lighthouses for air navigation.to the left of Ostrowite the tower was in the vicinity of Nekla, and in the east it was at Lubstowie. A generator on top of the tower was mounted movable reflector. Apparently, each of the towers used a different type of signal. In Ostrowite after dark, a lantern began to turn. It was probably dismantled by Germany during the occupation. However, there is the possibility that it was taken apart for scrap. This is an unusual monument, perhaps unique in all of Poland.
