= Białkowo, Kuyavian-Pomeranian Voivodeship =

Białkowo
- Village
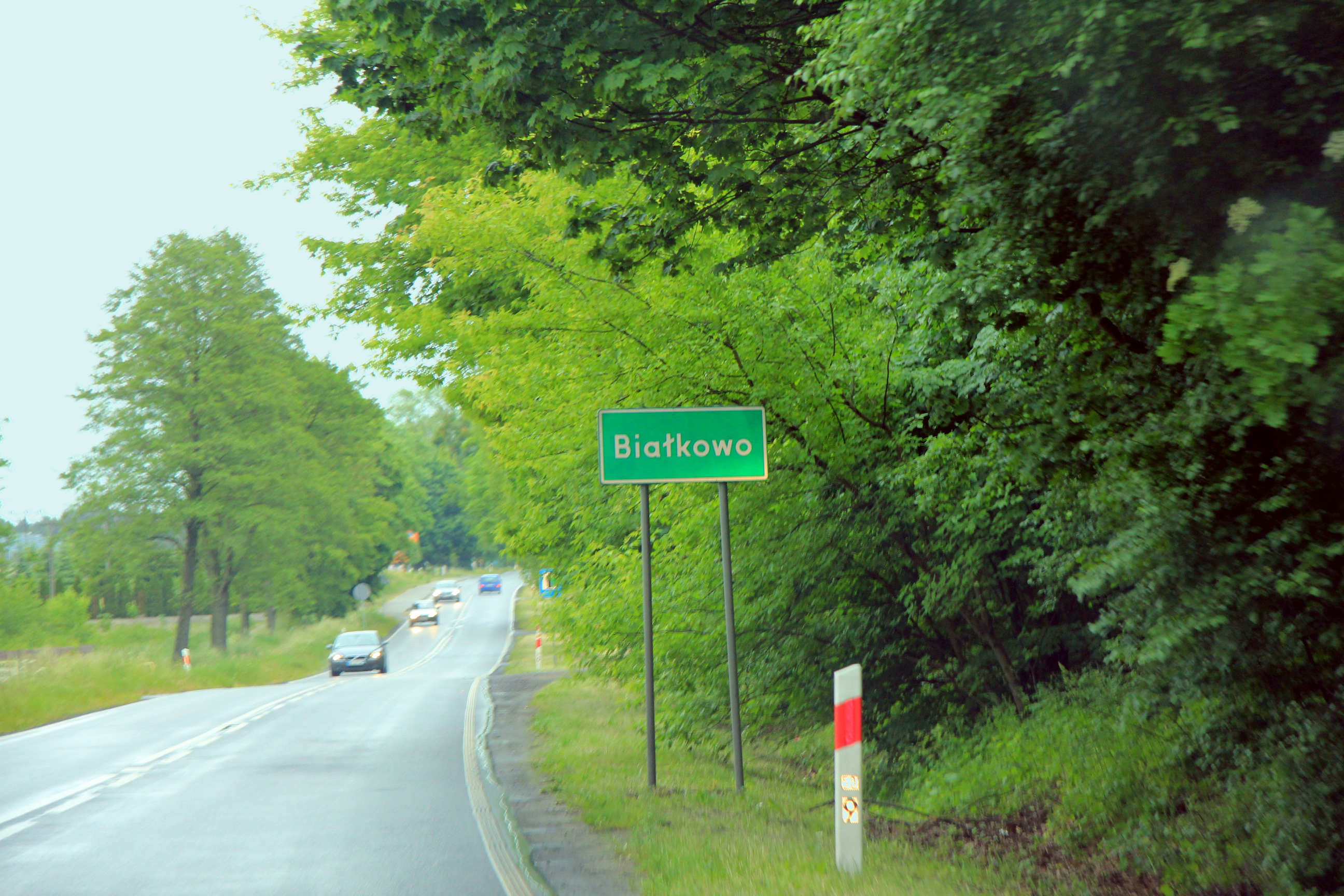

- Location within Poland
- Coordinates: 53°7′N 19°7′E
- Country: Poland
- Voivodeship: Kuyavian-Pomeranian
- County: Golub-Dobrzyń
- Gmina: Golub-Dobrzyń

Białkowo [bjau̯ˈkɔvɔ] is a village in the administrative district of Gmina Golub-Dobrzyń, within Golub-Dobrzyń County, Kuyavian-Pomeranian Voivodeship, in north-central Poland.
