= Połoniny, Warmian-Masurian Voivodeship =

Połoniny
- Settlement
- Location within Poland
- Coordinates: 54°16′13″N 19°25′51″E
- Country: Poland
- Voivodeship: Warmian-Masurian
- County: Elbląg
- Gmina: Tolkmicko

Połoniny [pɔwɔˈninɨ] is a settlement in the administrative district of Gmina Tolkmicko, within Elbląg County, Warmian-Masurian Voivodeship, in northern Poland.
