= Wysoki Bór =

- Settlement
- Location within Poland
- Coordinates: 54°18′8″N 19°31′25″E
- Country: Poland
- Voivodeship: Warmian-Masurian
- County: Elbląg
- Gmina: Tolkmicko

Wysoki Bór (Polish pronunciation: [vɨˈsɔkʲi ˈbur]) is a settlement in the administrative district of Gmina Tolkmicko, within Elbląg County, Warmian-Masurian Voivodeship, in northern Poland.
