= Święty Kamień, Elbląg County =

Święty Kamień
- Settlement
- Location within Poland
- Coordinates: 54°20′16″N 19°37′4″E
- Country: Poland
- Voivodeship: Warmian-Masurian
- County: Elbląg
- Gmina: Tolkmicko
- Population: 80

Święty Kamień (Polish pronunciation: [ˈɕfjɛntɨ ˈkamjɛj̃]) is a settlement in the administrative district of Gmina Tolkmicko, within Elbląg County, Warmian-Masurian Voivodeship, in northern Poland.
