= Zwierzyniec, Lower Silesian Voivodeship =

Zwierzyniec
- Village
- Location within Poland
- Coordinates: 51°37′20″N 17°23′12″E
- Country: Poland
- Voivodeship: Lower Silesian
- County: Milicz
- Gmina: Cieszków

Zwierzyniec (Polish: [zvjɛˈʐɨɲɛt͡s]) is a village in the administrative district of Gmina Cieszków, within Milicz County, Lower Silesian Voivodeship, in south-western Poland.
