= Ostrogóra =

- Settlement
- Location within Poland
- Coordinates: 54°16′43″N 19°29′53″E
- Country: Poland
- Voivodeship: Warmian-Masurian
- County: Elbląg
- Gmina: Tolkmicko
- Time zone: UTC+1 (CET)
  - Summer (DST): UTC+2 (CEST)
- Vehicle registration: NEB

Ostrogóra [ɔstrɔˈɡura] is a settlement part of the village of Kadyny, in the administrative district of Gmina Tolkmicko, within Elbląg County, Warmian-Masurian Voivodeship, in northern Poland.

From 1432 the settlement was owned by Jan Bażyński and was part of an estate centered in Kadyny. It was annexed by Prussia in the First Partition of Poland in 1772, and from 1871 to 1945 it also formed part of Germany (within the province of East Prussia), before it was restored to Poland after Nazi Germany's defeat in World War II.
