= Przybyłowo =

- Village
- Location within Poland
- Coordinates: 54°16′17″N 19°33′39″E
- Country: Poland
- Voivodeship: Warmian-Masurian
- County: Elbląg
- Gmina: Tolkmicko
- Population: 100

Przybyłowo [pʂɨbɨˈwɔvɔ] is a village in the administrative district of Gmina Tolkmicko, within Elbląg County, Warmian-Masurian Voivodeship, in northern Poland.

Before 1772 the area was part of Kingdom of Poland, and in 1772–1945 it belonged to Prussia and Germany (East Prussia).
