= Nadbrzeże =

- Settlement
- Location within Poland
- Coordinates: 54°16′21″N 19°25′4″E
- Country: Poland
- Voivodeship: Warmian-Masurian
- County: Elbląg
- Gmina: Tolkmicko
- Time zone: UTC+1 (CET)
  - Summer (DST): UTC+2 (CEST)
- Vehicle registration: NEB

Nadbrzeże [nadˈbʐɛʐɛ] is a settlement in the administrative district of Gmina Tolkmicko, within Elbląg County, Warmian-Masurian Voivodeship, in northern Poland.

== History ==
The village was part of the Kingdom of Poland until the First Partition of Poland in 1772, when it was annexed by Prussia. In 1871 it became part of Germany, within which it was administratively part of the province of East Prussia. During World War II, in 1942–1945, it was the location of a subcamp of the Stutthof concentration camp, considered the heaviest of all the Stutthof subcamps. Over 300 people were subjected by the Germans to forced labour at a local brickyard. Dead prisoners were constantly replaced by new ones sent from the Stutthof camp. One of its prisoners was a Pole, Wacław Mitura, who published his memoirs of his stay in the camp in book form after the war. Following Germany's defeat in World War II, in 1945, the village was reintegrated with Poland.
