= Pakosławsko =

- Village
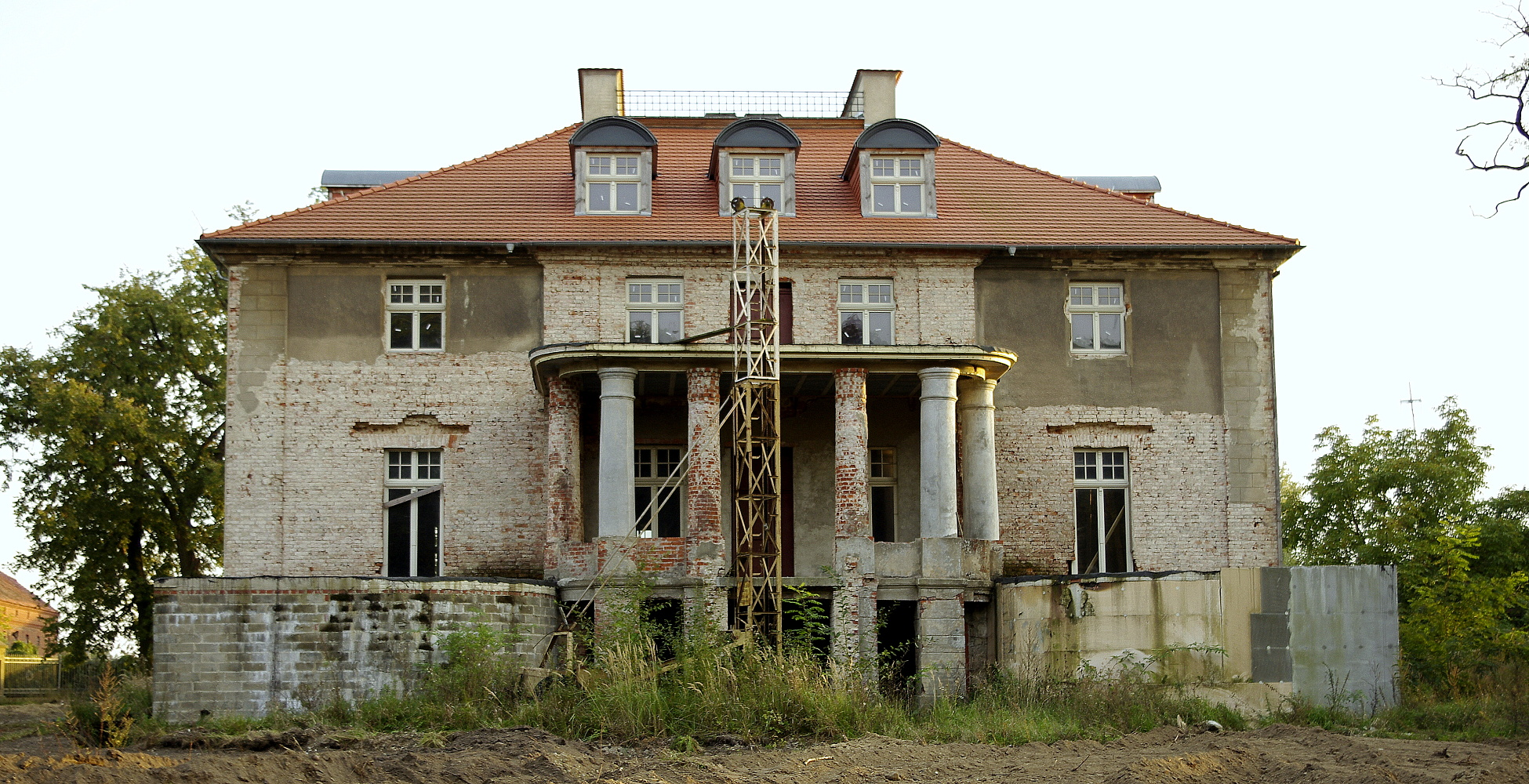
- Palace

- Location within Poland
- Coordinates: 51°37′N 17°18′E
- Country: Poland
- Voivodeship: Lower Silesian
- County: Milicz
- Gmina: Cieszków

Pakosławsko [pakɔˈswafskɔ] is a village in the administrative district of Gmina Cieszków, within Milicz County, Lower Silesian Voivodeship, in south-western Poland.
