= Sędraszyce =

- Village
- Location within Poland
- Coordinates: 51°38′21″N 17°18′35″E
- Country: Poland
- Voivodeship: Lower Silesian
- County: Milicz
- Gmina: Cieszków

Sędraszyce [sɛndraˈʂɨt͡sɛ] is a village in the administrative district of Gmina Cieszków, within Milicz County, Lower Silesian Voivodeship, in south-western Poland.
