= Kamienica Elbląska =

- Settlement
- Location within Poland
- Coordinates: 54°15′44″N 19°24′19″E
- Country: Poland
- Voivodeship: Warmian-Masurian
- County: Elbląg
- Gmina: Tolkmicko

Kamienica Elbląska [kamjɛˈnit͡sa ɛlˈblɔ̃ska] is a settlement in the administrative district of Gmina Tolkmicko, within Elbląg County, Warmian-Masurian Voivodeship, in northern Poland.
