= Cieszyny, Kuyavian-Pomeranian Voivodeship =

Cieszyny
- Village
- Location within Poland
- Coordinates: 53°13′N 19°13′E
- Country: Poland
- Voivodeship: Kuyavian-Pomeranian
- County: Golub-Dobrzyń
- Gmina: Golub-Dobrzyń

Cieszyny [t͡ɕɛˈʂɨnɨ] is a village in the administrative district of Gmina Golub-Dobrzyń, within Golub-Dobrzyń County, Kuyavian-Pomeranian Voivodeship, in north-central Poland.
