= Zymanów =

- Village
- Location within Poland
- Coordinates: 51°36′20″N 17°16′24″E
- Country: Poland
- Voivodeship: Lower Silesian
- County: Milicz
- Gmina: Cieszków

Zymanów [zɨˈmanuf] is a village in the administrative district of Gmina Cieszków, within Milicz County, Lower Silesian Voivodeship, in south-western Poland.
