= Jankowa, Lower Silesian Voivodeship =

Jankowa
- Village
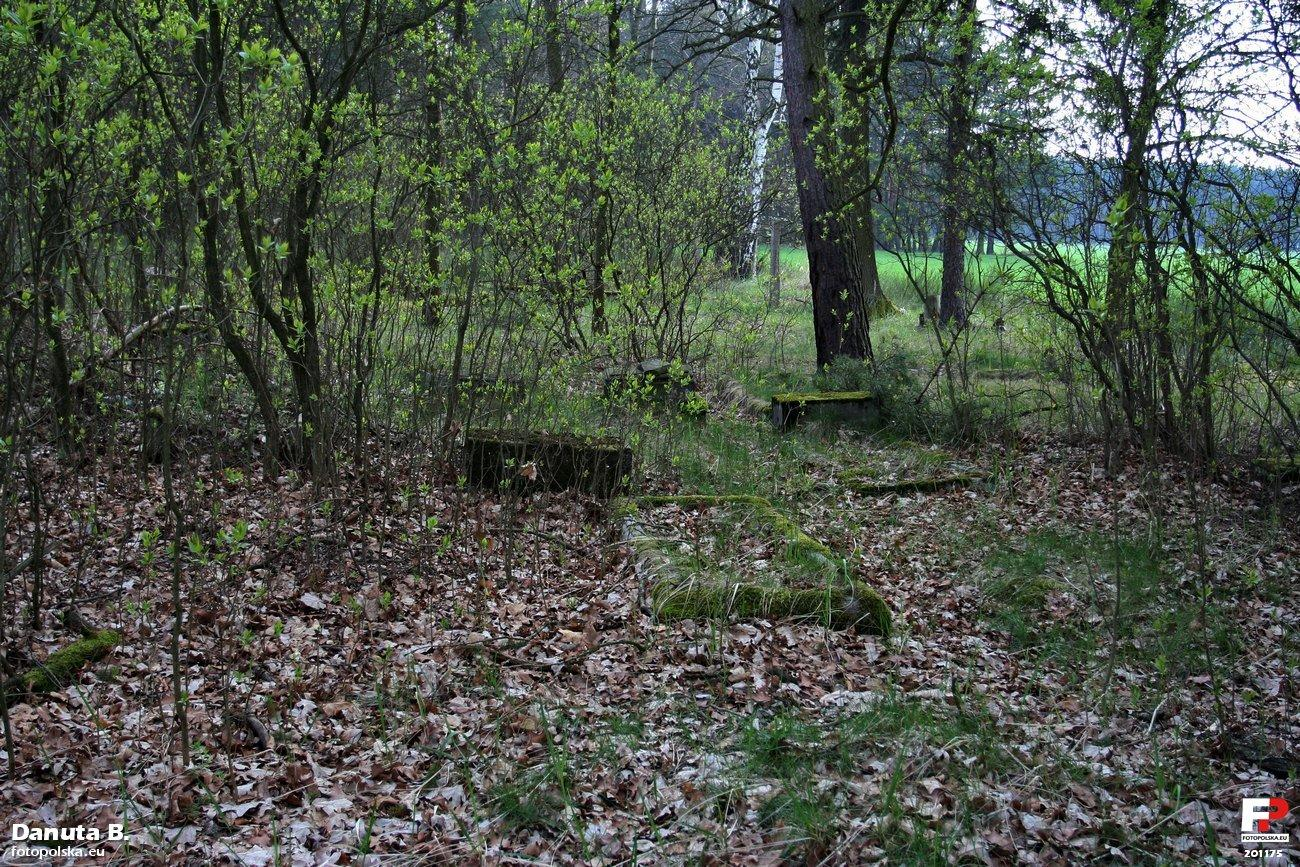
- Former Protestant cemetery

- Location within Poland
- Coordinates: 51°35′08″N 17°23′19″E
- Country: Poland
- Voivodeship: Lower Silesian
- County: Milicz
- Gmina: Cieszków

Jankowa [janˈkɔva] is a village in the administrative district of Gmina Cieszków, within Milicz County, Lower Silesian Voivodeship, in south-western Poland.
