= Rangóry =

- Settlement
- Location within Poland
- Coordinates: 54°14′36″N 19°23′49″E
- Country: Poland
- Voivodeship: Warmian-Masurian
- County: Elbląg
- Gmina: Tolkmicko
- Population: 36

Rangóry [ranˈɡurɨ] is a settlement in the administrative district of Gmina Tolkmicko, within Elbląg County, Warmian-Masurian Voivodeship, in northern Poland.
