= Słabocin =

- Village
- Location within Poland
- Coordinates: 51°36′09″N 17°16′23″E
- Country: Poland
- Voivodeship: Lower Silesian
- County: Milicz
- Gmina: Cieszków

Słabocin [swaˈbɔt͡ɕin] is a village in the administrative district of Gmina Cieszków, within Milicz County, Lower Silesian Voivodeship, in south-western Poland.
