= Nowa Wieś, Gmina Golub-Dobrzyń =

Nowa Wieś
- Village
- Location within Poland
- Coordinates: 53°3′2″N 18°58′22″E
- Country: Poland
- Voivodeship: Kuyavian-Pomeranian
- County: Golub-Dobrzyń
- Gmina: Golub-Dobrzyń

Nowa Wieś [ˈnɔva ˈvjɛɕ] is a village in the administrative district of Gmina Golub-Dobrzyń, within Golub-Dobrzyń County, Kuyavian-Pomeranian Voivodeship, in north-central Poland.
