= Wodynia =

- Village
- Location within Poland
- Coordinates: 54°17′31″N 19°37′23″E
- Country: Poland
- Voivodeship: Warmian-Masurian
- County: Elbląg
- Gmina: Tolkmicko
- Population: 40

Wodynia [vɔˈdɨɲa] is a village in the administrative district of Gmina Tolkmicko, within Elbląg County, Warmian-Masurian Voivodeship, in northern Poland.
