= Przylesie, Warmian-Masurian Voivodeship =

Przylesie
- Settlement
- Location within Poland
- Coordinates: 54°20′6″N 19°37′3″E
- Country: Poland
- Voivodeship: Warmian-Masurian
- County: Elbląg
- Gmina: Tolkmicko
- Population: 0

Przylesie [pʂɨˈlɛɕɛ] is a former settlement in the administrative district of Gmina Tolkmicko, within Elbląg County, Warmian-Masurian Voivodeship, in northern Poland.
