= Gałczewko =

- Village
- Location within Poland
- Coordinates: 53°10′1″N 19°3′42″E
- Country: Poland
- Voivodeship: Kuyavian-Pomeranian
- County: Golub-Dobrzyń
- Gmina: Golub-Dobrzyń

Gałczewko [ɡau̯ˈt͡ʂɛfkɔ] is a village in the administrative district of Gmina Golub-Dobrzyń, within Golub-Dobrzyń County, Kuyavian-Pomeranian Voivodeship, in north-central Poland.
