= Janówek, Warmian-Masurian Voivodeship =

Janówek
- Village
- Location within Poland
- Coordinates: 54°18′28″N 19°30′37″E
- Country: Poland
- Voivodeship: Warmian-Masurian
- County: Elbląg
- Gmina: Tolkmicko
- Population: 90

Janówek [jaˈnuvɛk] is a village in the administrative district of Gmina Tolkmicko, within Elbląg County, Warmian-Masurian Voivodeship, in northern Poland.
