= Jawor, Milicz County =

Jawor
- Village
- Location within Poland
- Coordinates: 51°35′33″N 17°20′15″E
- Country: Poland
- Voivodeship: Lower Silesian
- County: Milicz
- Gmina: Cieszków

Jawor [ˈjavɔr] ("sycamore") is a village in the administrative district of Gmina Cieszków, within Milicz County, Lower Silesian Voivodeship, in south-western Poland.
