= Gmina Cieszków =

Gmina Cieszków Cieszków Commune
- Gmina
- Flag Coat of arms
- Interactive map of Gmina Cieszków
- Coordinates (Cieszków): 51°38′N 17°21′E
- Country: Poland
- Voivodeship: Lower Silesian
- County: Milicz
- Seat: Cieszków
- Sołectwos: Biadaszka, Brzezina, Cieszków, Dziadkowo, Góry, Guzowice, Jankowa, Jawor, Nowy Folwark, Pakosławsko, Rakłowice, Sędraszyce, Słabocin, Trzebicko, Ujazd, Wężowice, Zwierzyniec

Area
  - Total: 100.67 km^{2} (38.87 sq mi)

Population (2019-06-30)
  - Total: 4,680
  - Density: 46.5/km^{2} (120/sq mi)
- Website: http://www.cieszkow.pl/

Gmina Cieszków is a rural gmina (administrative district) in Milicz County, Lower Silesian Voivodeship, in south-western Poland. Its seat is the village of Cieszków, which lies approximately 13 kilometres (8 mi) north-east of Milicz, and 61 kilometres (38 mi) north of the regional capital Wrocław.

The gmina covers an area of 100.67 square kilometres (38.9 sq mi), and as of 2019 its total population is 4,680.

== Neighbouring gminas ==
Gmina Cieszków is bordered by the gminas of Jutrosin, Milicz and Zduny.

== Villages ==
The gmina contains the villages of Biadaszka, Brzezina, Cieszków, Dziadkowo, Góry, Grzebielin, Guzowice, Jankowa, Jawor, Nowy Folwark, Pakosławsko, Pustków, Rakłowice, Sędraszyce, Słabocin, Trzebicko, Trzebicko Dolne, Trzebicko-Piaski, Ujazd, Wężowice, Zwierzyniec and Zymanów.
