= Dziadkowo, Lower Silesian Voivodeship =

Dziadkowo
- Village
- Location within Poland
- Coordinates: 51°35′17″N 17°17′37″E
- Country: Poland
- Voivodeship: Lower Silesian
- County: Milicz
- Gmina: Cieszków

Dziadkowo [d͡ʑatˈkɔvɔ] is a village in the administrative district of Gmina Cieszków, within Milicz County, Lower Silesian Voivodeship, in south-western Poland.
