= Olszówka, Kuyavian-Pomeranian Voivodeship =

Olszówka
- Village
- Location within Poland
- Coordinates: 53°5′47″N 19°0′27″E
- Country: Poland
- Voivodeship: Kuyavian-Pomeranian
- County: Golub-Dobrzyń
- Gmina: Golub-Dobrzyń
- Population: 220

Olszówka [ɔlˈʂufka] is a village in the administrative district of Gmina Golub-Dobrzyń, within Golub-Dobrzyń County, Kuyavian-Pomeranian Voivodeship, in north-central Poland.
