= Ujazd, Lower Silesian Voivodeship =

Ujazd
- Village
- Location within Poland
- Coordinates: 51°37′34″N 17°26′31″E
- Country: Poland
- Voivodeship: Lower Silesian
- County: Milicz
- Gmina: Cieszków
- Time zone: UTC+1 (CET)
  - Summer (DST): UTC+2 (CEST)
- Vehicle registration: DMI

Ujazd [ˈujast] is a village in the administrative district of Gmina Cieszków, within Milicz County, Lower Silesian Voivodeship, in south-western Poland.
