= Kamionek Wielki, Elbląg County =

Kamionek Wielki
- Village
- Location within Poland
- Coordinates: 54°16′7″N 19°28′29″E
- Country: Poland
- Voivodeship: Warmian-Masurian
- County: Elbląg
- Gmina: Tolkmicko
- Population: 383

Kamionek Wielki (Polish pronunciation: [kaˈmjɔnɛk ˈfjɛlkʲi]) is a village in the administrative district of Gmina Tolkmicko, within Elbląg County, Warmian-Masurian Voivodeship, in northern Poland.
