= Rakłowice =

- Village
- Location within Poland
- Coordinates: 51°35′32″N 17°18′36″E
- Country: Poland
- Voivodeship: Lower Silesian
- County: Milicz
- Gmina: Cieszków
- Vehicle registration: DMI

Rakłowice [rakwɔˈvit͡sɛ] is a village in the administrative district of Gmina Cieszków, within Milicz County, Lower Silesian Voivodeship, in south-western Poland.

The name of the village is of Polish origin and comes from the word rak, which means "crayfish".
