= Trzebicko-Piaski =

- Village
- Location within Poland
- Coordinates: 51°35′58″N 17°24′19″E
- Country: Poland
- Voivodeship: Lower Silesian
- County: Milicz
- Gmina: Cieszków

Trzebicko-Piaski (Polish pronunciation: [tʂɛˈbitskɔ ˈpjaskʲi]) is a village in the administrative district of Gmina Cieszków, within Milicz County, Lower Silesian Voivodeship, in south-western Poland.
