= Gmina Golub-Dobrzyń =

Gmina Golub-Dobrzyń Golub-Dobrzyń Commune
- Gmina
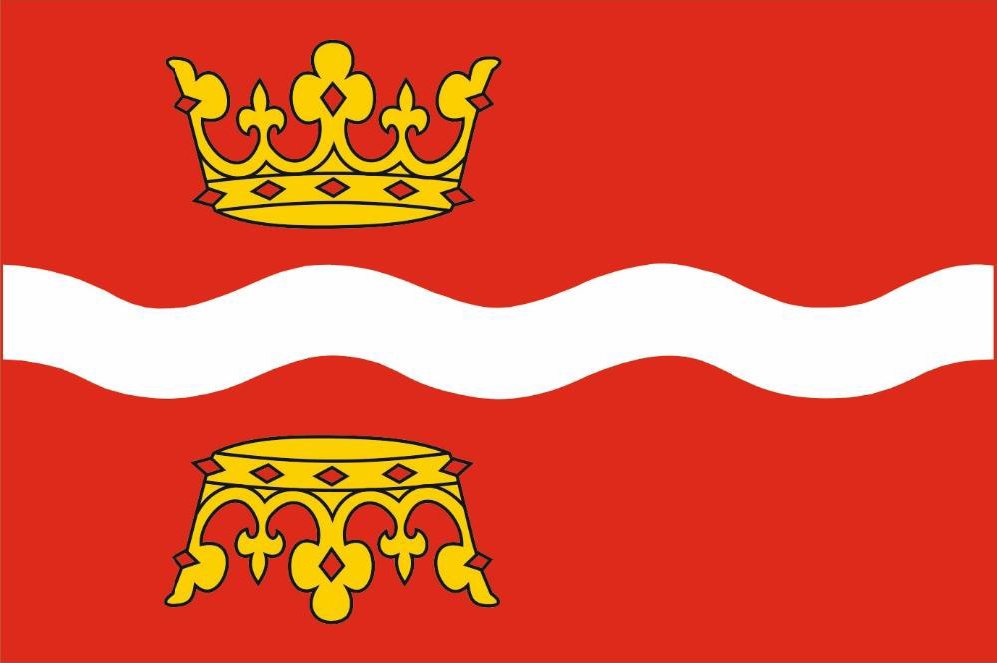
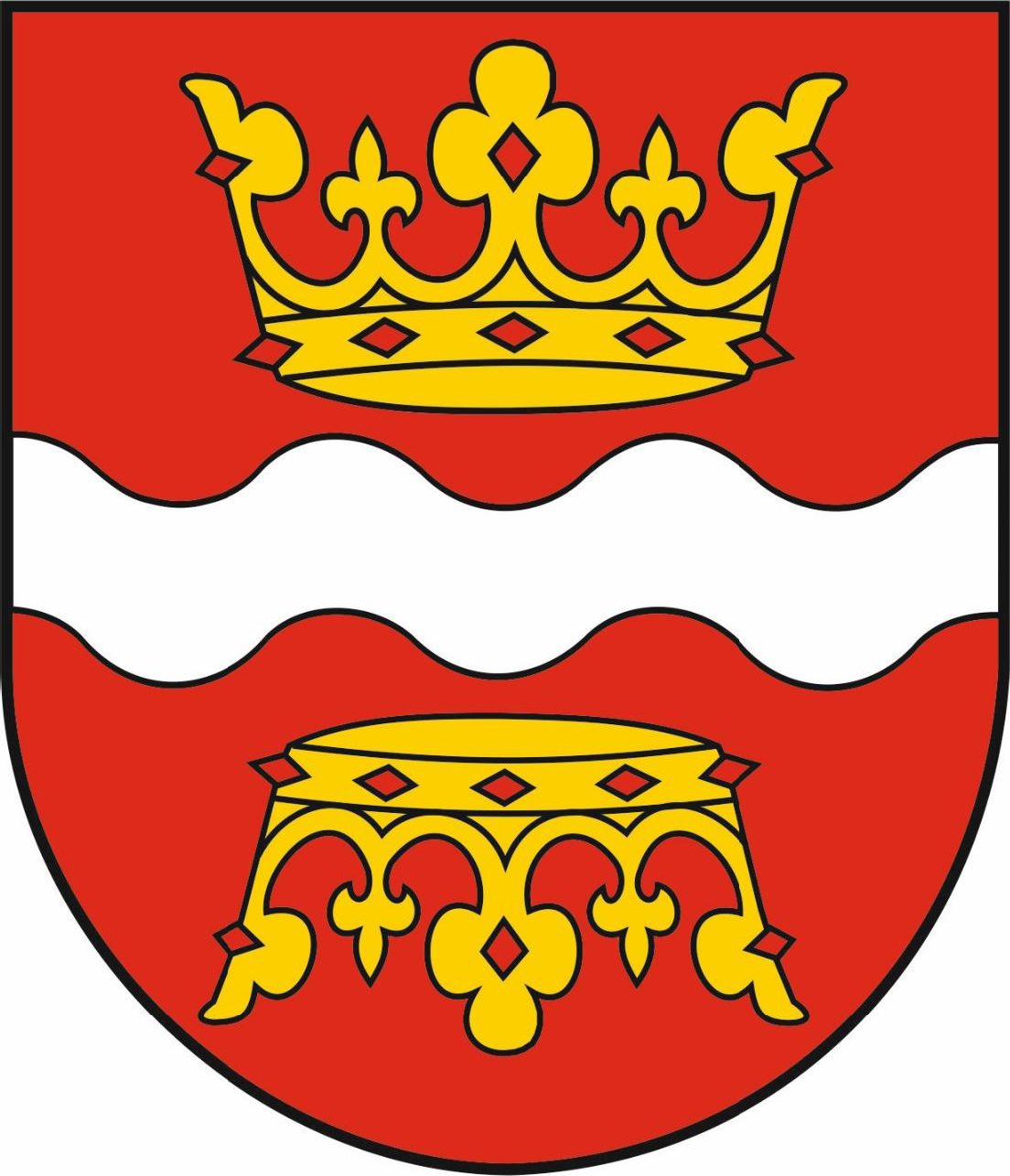
- Flag Coat of arms
- Interactive map of Gmina Golub-Dobrzyń
- Coordinates (Golub-Dobrzyń): 53°6′N 19°3′E
- Country: Poland
- Voivodeship: Kuyavian-Pomeranian
- County: Golub-Dobrzyń
- Seat: Golub-Dobrzyń

Area
  - Total: 197.45 km^{2} (76.24 sq mi)

Population (2006)
  - Total: 8,139
  - Density: 41.22/km^{2} (106.8/sq mi)
- Website: http://www.golub-dobrzyn.ug.gov.pl/

Gmina Golub-Dobrzyń is a rural gmina (administrative district) in Golub-Dobrzyń County, Kuyavian-Pomeranian Voivodeship, in north-central Poland. Its seat is the town of Golub-Dobrzyń, although the town is not part of the territory of the gmina.

The gmina covers an area of 197.45 square kilometres (76.2 sq mi), and as of 2006 its total population is 8,139.

== Villages ==
Gmina Golub-Dobrzyń contains the villages and settlements of Białkowo, Cieszyny, Duża Kujawa, Gajewo, Gałczewko, Karczewo, Lisewo, Macikowo, Nowa Wieś, Nowogród, Olszówka, Ostrowite, Paliwodzizna, Pląchoty, Podzamek Golubski, Pusta Dąbrówka, Skępsk, Sokoligóra, Sokołowo, Węgiersk and Wrocki.

== Neighbouring gminas ==
Gmina Golub-Dobrzyń is bordered by the town of Golub-Dobrzyń and by the gminas of Bobrowo, Ciechocin, Dębowa Łąka, Kowalewo Pomorskie, Radomin, Wąpielsk and Zbójno.
