= Jabłonka, Kuyavian-Pomeranian Voivodeship =

Jabłonka
- Village
- Location within Poland
- Coordinates: 53°40′22″N 18°8′11″E
- Country: Poland
- Voivodeship: Kuyavian-Pomeranian
- County: Tuchola
- Gmina: Śliwice

Population (2006)
  - Total: 70
- Time zone: UTC+1 (CET)
  - Summer (DST): UTC+2 (CEST)
- Area code: (+48) 52

Jabłonka [jaˈbwɔnka] is a village in the administrative district of Gmina Śliwice, within Tuchola County, Kuyavian-Pomeranian Voivodeship, in north-central Poland.

In the years 1975-1998, the administrative district belonged to the Bydgoszcz Voivodship.
