= Podzamek Golubski =

- Village
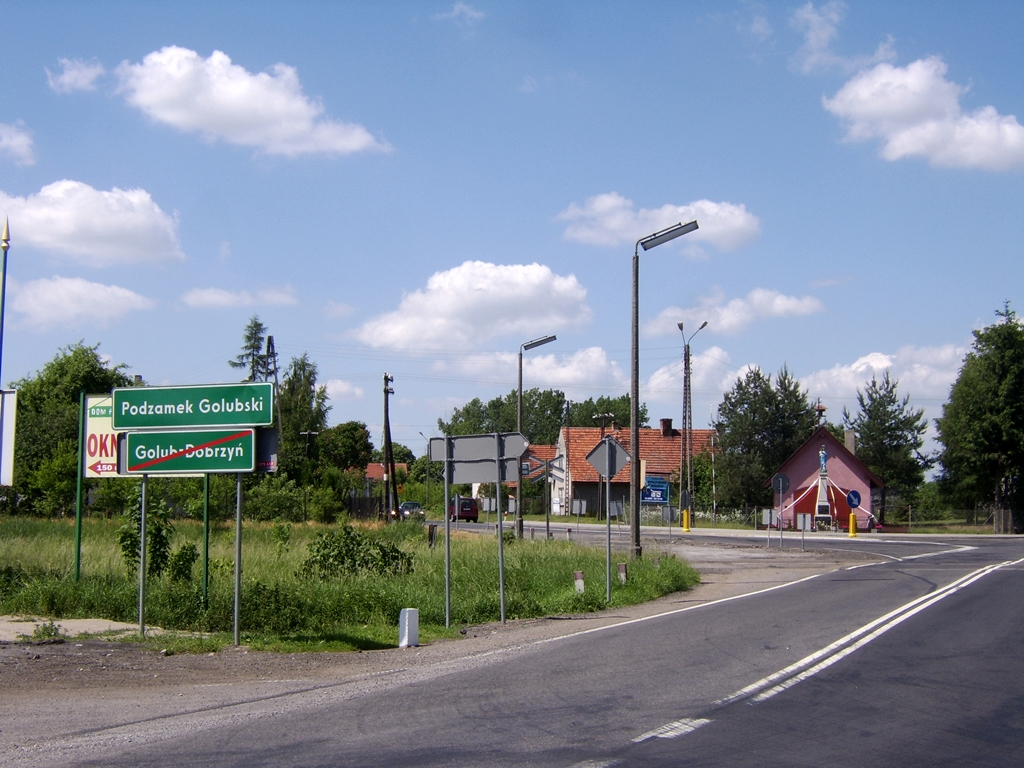
- Street and road sign of Podzamek Golubski

- Location within Poland
- Coordinates: 53°07′36″N 19°01′47″E
- Country: Poland
- Voivodeship: Kuyavian-Pomeranian
- County: Golub-Dobrzyń
- Gmina: Golub-Dobrzyń

Podzamek Golubski [pɔˈd͡zamɛk ɡɔˈlupski] is a village in the administrative district of Gmina Golub-Dobrzyń, within Golub-Dobrzyń County, Kuyavian-Pomeranian Voivodeship, in north-central Poland.
