= Nowinka, Warmian-Masurian Voivodeship =

Nowinka
- Village
- Location within Poland
- Coordinates: 54°18′37″N 19°33′51″E
- Country: Poland
- Voivodeship: Warmian-Masurian
- County: Elbląg
- Gmina: Tolkmicko
- Population: 60

Nowinka [nɔˈvinka] is a village in the administrative district of Gmina Tolkmicko, within Elbląg County, Warmian-Masurian Voivodeship, in northern Poland.
