= Lower Austrian Village and Urban Renewal =

Lower Austrian Village and Urban Renewal Association
- NÖ Dorf- und Stadterneuerung
- Registration no.: 550714705
- Purpose: Association for country, regional, and community development
- Headquarters: Hollabrunn, Amtsgasse 9
- Coordinates: 48.56256°N 16.08027°E
- Region served: Lower Austria, Austria
- Members: approx. 500 municipalities / local associations
- Chairwoman: ÖkR Maria Forstner
- Deputy Chairman: Bgm. Otmar Kowar
- Secretary: Johann Mayer
- Treasurer: Bgm. Friederich Buchberger
- Staff: 28

The Lower Austrian Village and Urban Renewal Association (German: Niederösterreichische Dorf- und Stadterneuerung) is the central joint spatial planning organization of all municipalities of the Lower Austria province.

This organization has a special position in Austria as the pioneer of regional development in Austria and the only association of its kind with the exception of Styria and Salzburg. In other countries the provincial government is directly responsible.
