= Anna Brzezińska =

Anna Brzezińska is the name of:

- Anna Brzezińska (athlete) (born 1971), Polish middle-distance runner
- Anna Brzezińska (writer) (born 1971), Polish fantasy author
