= Brzezina, Milicz County =

Brzezina
- Village
- Location within Poland
- Coordinates: 51°37′05″N 17°16′50″E
- Country: Poland
- Voivodeship: Lower Silesian
- County: Milicz
- Gmina: Cieszków

Brzezina [bʐɛˈʑina] is a village in the administrative district of Gmina Cieszków, within Milicz County, Lower Silesian Voivodeship, in south-western Poland.
