= Katarzyna Agnieszka Ludwika Sapieha =

Polish noblewoman (1718–1779)

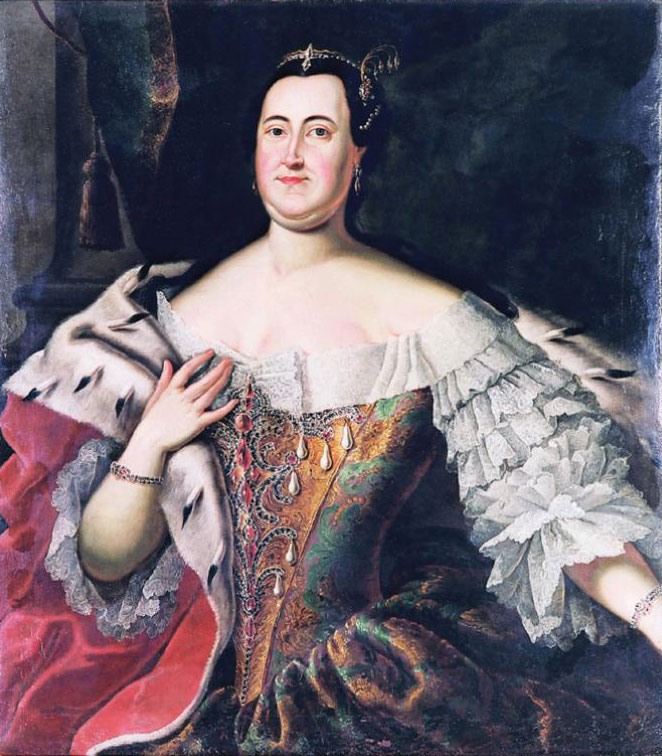
Kaciaryna Ludvika Sapieha. Кацярына Людвіка Сапега (G. Knoefvel, 1762)

Katarzyna Agnieszka Ludwika z Sapiehów Sapieżyna (1718–1779) was a Polish noblewoman. She is foremost known for her political activity. She was a supporter and participant of the Bar Confederation (1768–1772).
