= Wacław Brzeziński =

Polish baritone and teacher (1878–1955)

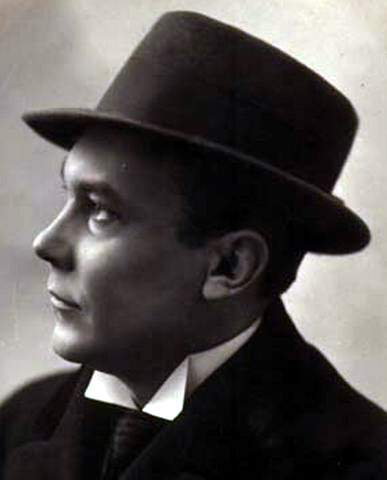
- Wacław Brzeziński circa 1920
- Born: 15 September 1878; Warsaw, Poland
- Died: 13 February 1955 (aged 76); Łódź, Poland

Wacław Cyprian Brzeziński (15 September 1878 – 13 February 1955) was a Polish operatic baritone, opera manager and academic voice teacher.

== Life ==
Brzeziński was born in Warsaw, the son of Teofil Brzeziński and his wife Henryka, née Małecka. He graduated from secondary school in Częstochowa, and then began his studies at the Warsaw University of Technology. Brzeziński made his stage debut in 1904 in the role of Plumkett in Flotow's Martha at the Teatro del Corso in Bologna, Italy. From 1904 to 1906, he studied singing with Witold Aleksandrowicz and performed with the Lviv Theatre of Opera and Ballet. In 1906, his first role at the Warsaw Opera was Sylvio in Leoncavallo's Pagliacci, and he remained a leading baritone at the house for two decades. He appeared there in the title roles of Rossini's Il barbiere di Siviglia, Verdi's Rigoletto, Tchaikovsky's Eugene Onegin and Rubinstein's The Demon. He also performed in Moniuszko's The Haunted Manor, as Scarpia in Puccini's Tosca and Nevers in Meyerbeer's Les Huguenots, among others.

In the 1911/12 season, Brzeziński performed in southern Italy and Sicily, where he was praised as Rossini's Figaro and Verdi's Rigoletto. From 1916 to 1917, he partnered with Adam Dobosz and Adam Ostrowski, eventually becoming the manager of the Warsaw Opera (now Grand Theatre, Warsaw). He retired from the stage in 1926 due to a heart disease.

As a pedagogue, Brzeziński served as professor of music at the Warsaw Conservatory (now Chopin University of Music) from 1915 to 1916. From 1927 to 1930 he ran his own opera school but then returned to the Conservatory. From 1945 until his death, he lectured at the State Higher School of Music and the Theater School in Łódź. Among his students were Jerzy Czaplicki, Jerzy Garda, Jan Kiepura, Eugeniusz Mossakowski and Mieczysław Fogg.

His daughter was the singer and actress Hanna Brzezińska. He died in Łódź and was buried in the Powązki Cemetery in Warsaw.

== Awards ==
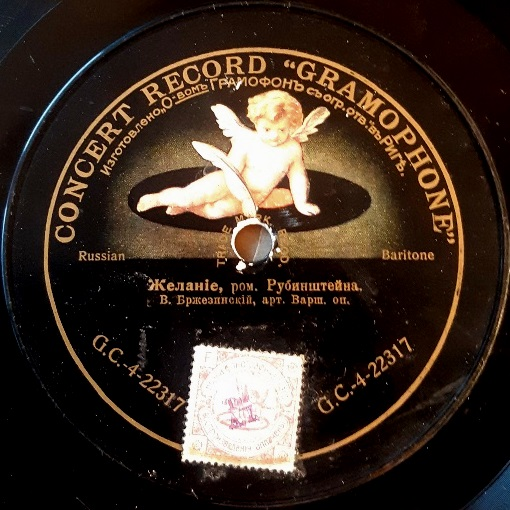
Record

In 1930, Brzeziński was awarded the Gold Cross of Merit of Poland "for merits in the field of artistic work and promotion of Polish art."
