= Tolkmicko =

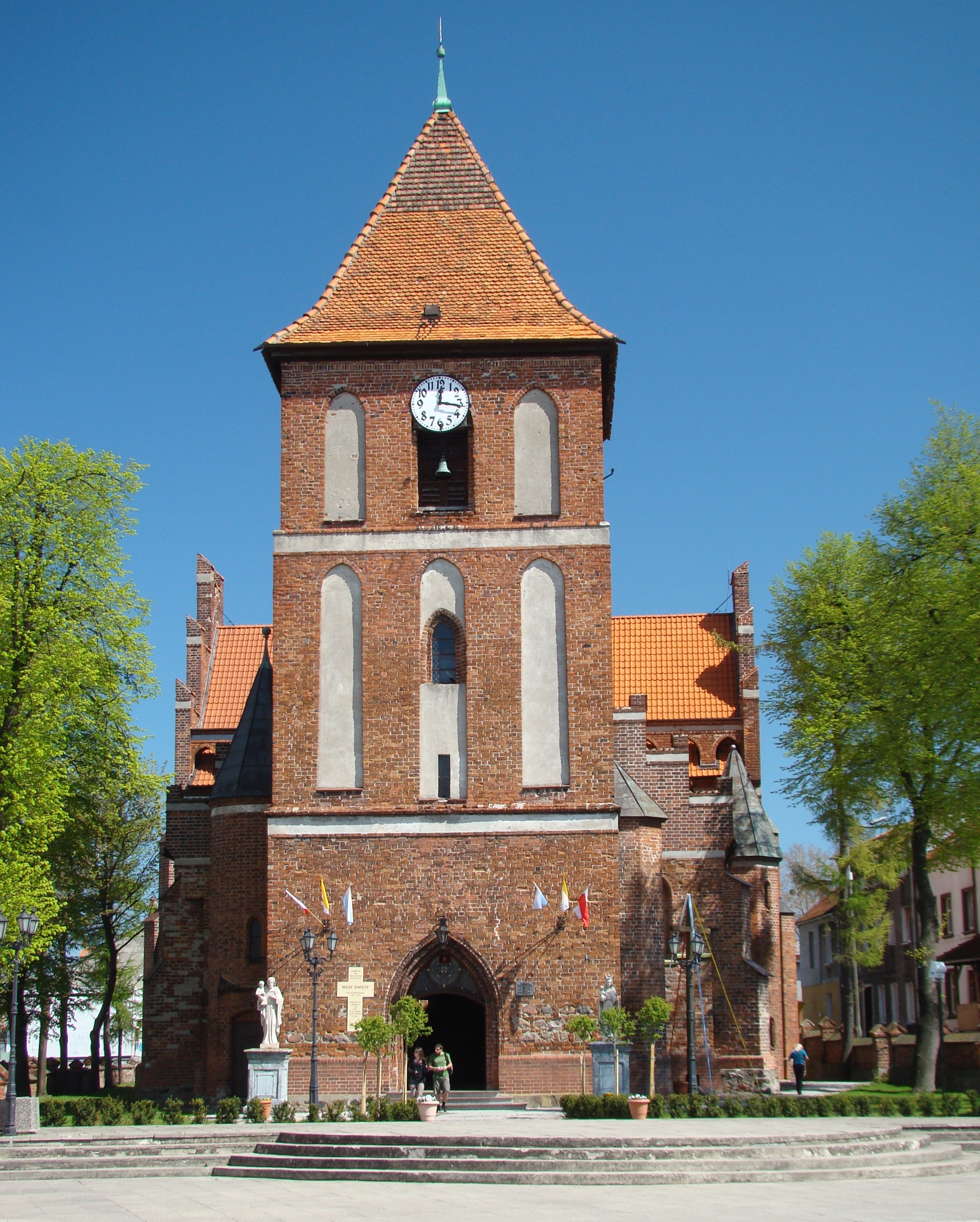
- Gothic Saint James church

- Coat of arms

- Location within Poland
- Coordinates: 54°19′14″N 19°31′50″E
- Country: Poland
- Voivodeship: Warmian-Masurian
- County: Elbląg
- Gmina: Tolkmicko
- Town rights: 1296

Area
  - Total: 2.28 km^{2} (0.88 sq mi)

Population (2006)
  - Total: 2,731
  - Density: 1,200/km^{2} (3,100/sq mi)
- Time zone: UTC+1 (CET)
  - Summer (DST): UTC+2 (CEST)
- Postal code: 82-340
- Vehicle registration: NEB
- Climate: Dfb
- Website: http://www.tolkmicko.pl

Tolkmicko (pronounced TOLK-mitzko [tɔlkˈmit͡skɔ], German: Tolkemit) is a town in northern Poland, on the Vistula Lagoon, about 20 km (12 mi) northeast of Elbląg. It is located in Warmian-Masurian Voivodeship, in Elbląg County. Its population is 2,766 (2004).

== History ==
=== Middle Ages ===
The site was first settled by Old Prussian tribes. The town rights followed the incorporation of the territory into the State of the Teutonic Order in 1296 and was based on the Kulm law by order of Ludwig von Schippe, then commander of the Teutonic Knights. On 21 March 1351 the Grand Master of the Teutonic Knights Heinrich Dusemer renewed the municipal law and together with the village of Neuendorf (now Nowinka) Tolkmicko obtained fishing legislation. In the 14th century the first church was built, and town walls were erected. Also a castle was built at the Castle Hill and the St. George Hospital was founded. In 1390 Peter Turnow, the Theologian later burned at the stake as a heretic in 1426, was born here.

On 3 April 1440 it became part of the anti-Teutonic Prussian Confederation, upon the request of which Polish King Casimir IV Jagiellon incorporated the region to the Kingdom of Poland in 1454, and the town recognized the Polish King as rightful ruler and joined Poland. In the beginning of the subsequent Thirteen Years' War (1454–1466), the townspeople captured and demolished the Teutonic castle, and in 1456 the town was ravaged and plundered by the Teutonic Knights. The first Polish starost (local royal official) of Tolkmicko was knight Jan Bażyński, leader of the Prussian Confederation, and the remains of the castle became the seat of local starosts since. The Teutonic Knights finally renounced any claims to the town and recognized it as part of Poland in the Second Peace of Thorn (1466), Tolkmicko was since part of the Polish Malbork Voivodeship of the autonomous province of Polish Prussia. It was seat of a county.

=== Modern era ===
During the last Polish–Teutonic War, in 1521 the Teutonic Knights, while retreating after the unsuccessful siege of Elbląg, briefly captured the town. In 1525, during the Reformation, the Church property formally became the Lutheran parish church. This was undertaken by a former monk named Bommler, son of the mayor of Tolkmicko. The town however remained in the Roman Catholic Bishopric of Warmia and thus remained subject to Catholic rule. After 1569 the special legal position of Polish Prussia within the Kingdom of Poland was slowly undermined, and the town was formally absorbed into Poland proper in 1572. It became part of the larger Greater Poland Province.

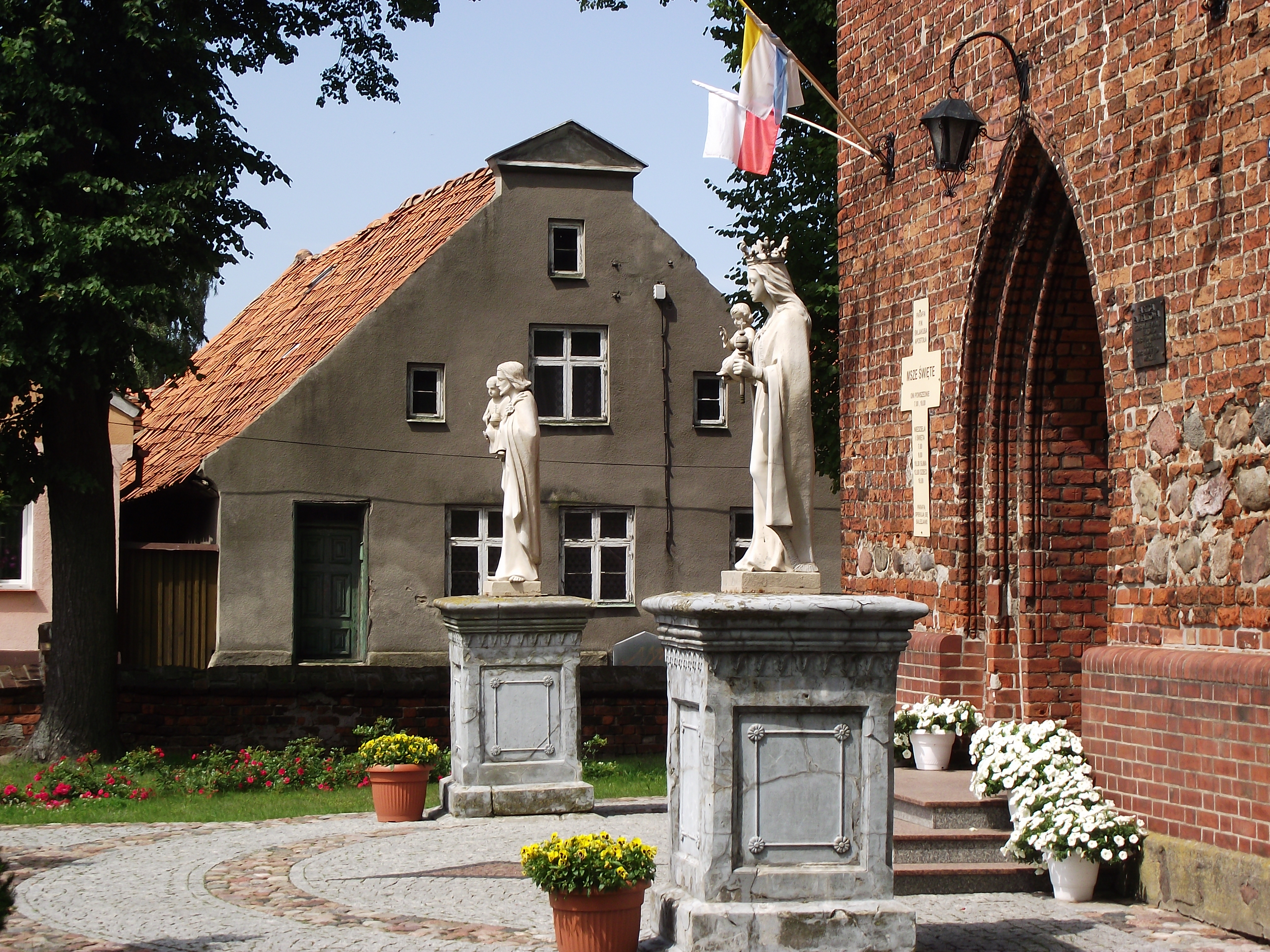
Baroque sculptures in front of the Saint James church

During the Polish-Swedish War the Swedish King Gustavus Adolphus of stayed in the town during 1626. Two large fires, in 1634 and 1694, partially destroyed the town. The town was revived at the turn of the 17th and 18th centuries after the end of Polish-Swedish wars.

The outbreak of the plague in 1710 halved the number of residents, although in 1720 there were enough people to justify building a brewery in the marketplace. By 1720, starost Jan Ignacy Działyński built a new impressive Baroque palace, as the seat of the starosts. There was yet another town fire in 1767, destroying the brewery, the Church and the Town Hall.

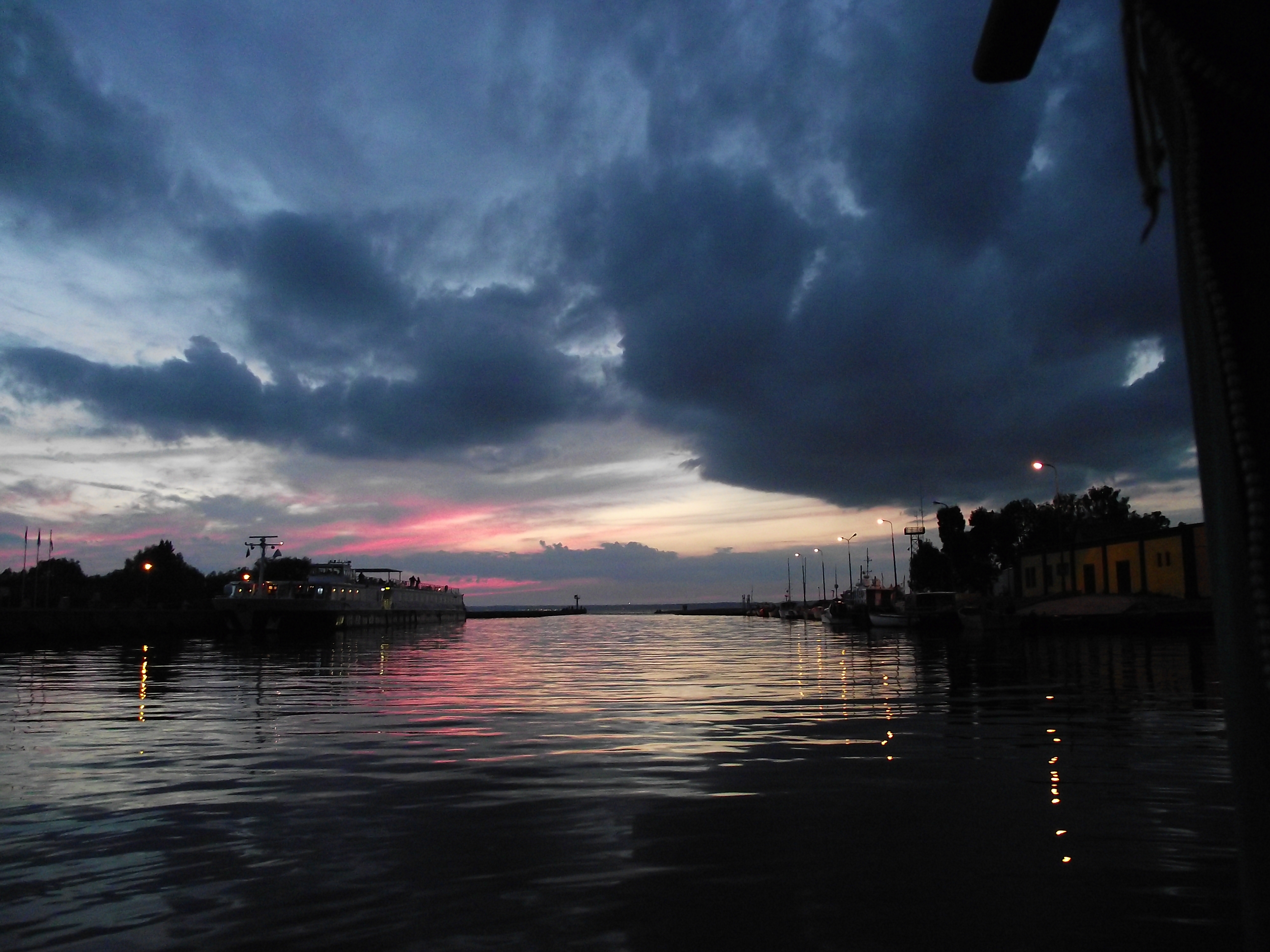
Port of Tolkmicko

During the first partition of Poland in 1772, the region was annexed by the Kingdom of Prussia and remained part of the province of East Prussia from 1773 until 1945. In 1793 a new town hall was built. During the Napoleonic Wars, in 1807 the town was held by France for almost a year, and many inhabitants were killed and the town suffered damages from shelling by Prussians, afterwards French troops marched through the town in 1812 and 1813, and it was also occupied by Russia in 1813. In the 19th century the Baroque Działyński Palace and the medieval St. George Hospital were dismantled, and the town lost two of its most distinctive landmarks. In 1818 the town became part of the newly formed district of Elbing. In 1832 the first pharmacy was opened. In 1851 the brewery closed and the first physician settled here. In 1862 construction began on the fishing harbor. In 1900, the town was connected to the rail network and joined Elbląg (then officially Elbing) and Braniewo (then Braunsberg). In the 19th century the town's population was overwhelmingly Roman Catholic.

=== 20th century ===
In 1939 the construction of a jam factory began, which was completed in 1940. During World War II, the town was captured by troops of the 2nd Belorussian Front of the Red Army on 26 January 1945 in the course of the East Prussian offensive. About 50% of the buildings were destroyed in the fighting. About half of the inhabitants had fled from the Soviets by the end of World War II, while the remaining German population was expelled over the following years in accordance with the Potsdam Agreement, while Poles stayed. Polish administration was established in May 1945, and the town returned to Poland after 173 years. It was repopulated by Poles, both those displaced from former eastern Poland annexed by the Soviet Union as well as settlers from war-devastated places in central Poland.

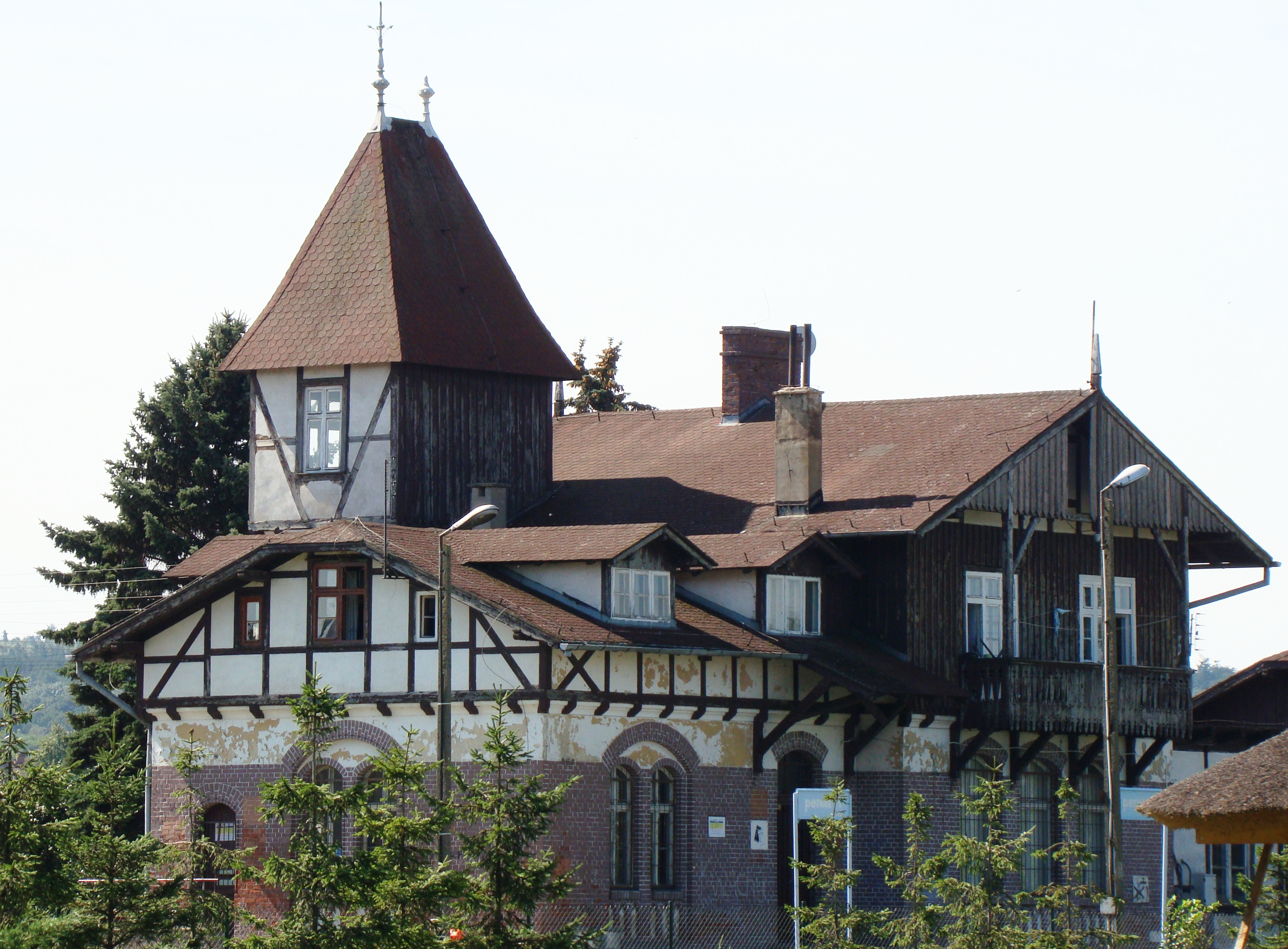
Train station

In 1975 an administrative reform transferred the town to the Elbląg Voivodeship. A later reform dissolved the province and the town became part of the Warmian-Masurian Voivodeship.

== Sports ==
The local football club is Barkas Tolkmicko. It competes in the lower leagues.
