= Wiktorowo =

Wiktorowo may refer to the following places:

- Wiktorowo, Grudziądz County, Grudziądz County, in Kuyavian-Pomeranian Voivodeship (north-central Poland)
- Wiktorowo, Gmina Lubień Kujawski, Włocławek County, in Kuyavian-Pomeranian Voivodeship (north-central Poland)
- Wiktorowo, Gmina Rogowo, Żnin County in Kuyavian-Pomeranian Voivodeship (north-central Poland)
- Wiktorowo, Podlaskie Voivodeship (north-east Poland)
- Wiktorowo, Gmina Nasielsk, Nowy Dwór County in Masovian Voivodeship (east-central Poland)
- Wiktorowo, Przasnysz County in Masovian Voivodeship (east-central Poland)
- Wiktorowo, Gmina Buk, Poznań County in Greater Poland Voivodeship (west-central Poland)
- Wiktorowo, Gmina Kostrzyn, Poznań County in Greater Poland Voivodeship (west-central Poland)
- Wiktorowo, Gmina Krzykosy, Środa County in Greater Poland Voivodeship (west-central Poland)
- Wiktorowo, Warmian-Masurian Voivodeship (north Poland)
