= Glinki =

Glinki may refer to the following places:

- Glinki, Greater Poland Voivodeship (west-central Poland)
- Glinki, Bydgoszcz County in Kuyavian-Pomeranian Voivodeship (north-central Poland)
- Glinki, Inowrocław County in Kuyavian-Pomeranian Voivodeship (north-central Poland)
- Glinki, Nakło County in Kuyavian-Pomeranian Voivodeship (north-central Poland)
- Glinki, Garwolin County in Masovian Voivodeship (east-central Poland)
- Glinki, Otwock County in Masovian Voivodeship (east-central Poland)
- Glinki, Sochaczew County in Masovian Voivodeship (east-central Poland)
- Glinki, Grajewo County in Podlaskie Voivodeship (north-east Poland)
- Glinki, Kolno County in Podlaskie Voivodeship (north-east Poland)
- Glinki, Puck County in Pomeranian Voivodeship (north Poland)
- Glinki, Działdowo County in Warmian-Masurian Voivodeship (north Poland)
- Glinki, Ełk County in Warmian-Masurian Voivodeship (north Poland)
- Glinki, West Pomeranian Voivodeship (north-west Poland)
- Glinki, Szczecin
