= Dakowy =

Dakowy may refer to the following places in Poland:

- Dakowy Mokre
- Dakowy Suche
