= Szopy =

Szopy may refer to:

- Szopy, Pomeranian Voivodeship, a part of the village of Będargowo, in the Pomeranian Voivodeship, Poland;
- Szopy, Warmian–Masurian Voivodeship, a village in the Warmian–Masurian Voivodeship, Poland;
- Szopy, Warsaw, a neighbourhood in the city of Warsaw, in Masovian Voivodeship, Poland;
- Warszawa Południowa railway station (known between 1937 and 1939 as Warszawa Szopy), a former railway station in Warsaw, Poland.
