= Nogat (disambiguation) =

The Nogat is a river in northern Poland.

Nogat may also refer to the following villages in Poland:

- Nogat, Kuyavian-Pomeranian Voivodeship
- Nogat, Warmian-Masurian Voivodeship

== See also ==
- NOGAT Pipeline System
