= Szewce-Zgoda =

- Village
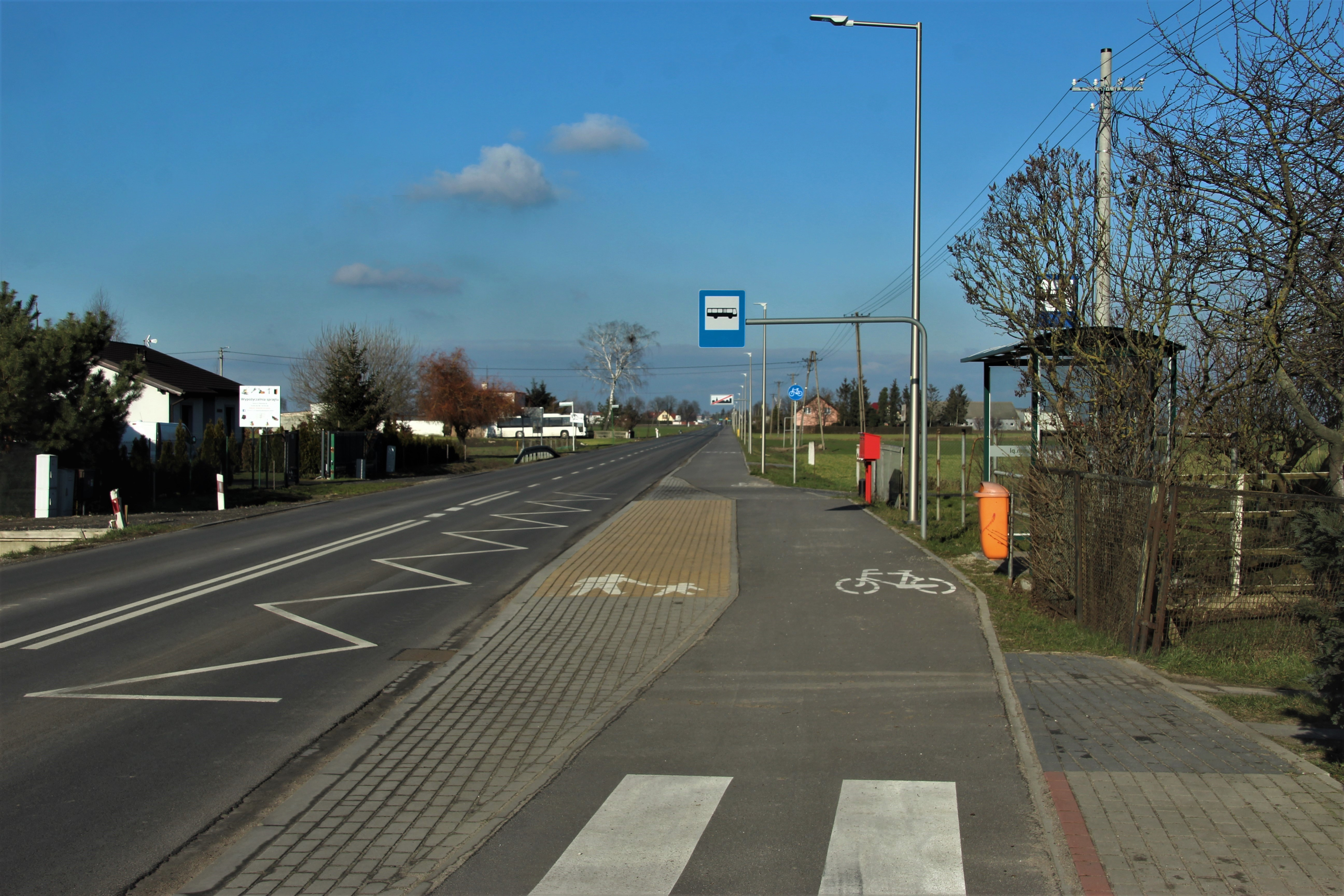

- Location within Poland
- Coordinates: 52°19′17″N 16°30′33″E
- Country: Poland
- Voivodeship: Greater Poland
- County: Poznań
- Gmina: Buk

Szewce-Zgoda [ˈʂɛft͡sɛ ˈzɡɔda] is a village in the administrative district of Gmina Buk, within Poznań County, Greater Poland Voivodeship, in west-central Poland.
