= Joanka, Poznań County =

Joanka
- Settlement
- Location within Poland
- Coordinates: 52°18′46″N 16°41′37″E
- Country: Poland
- Voivodeship: Greater Poland
- County: Poznań
- Gmina: Dopiewo
- Population: 10

Joanka [jɔˈanka] is a settlement in the administrative district of Gmina Dopiewo, within Poznań County, Greater Poland Voivodeship, in west-central Poland.
