= Skórzewo, Greater Poland Voivodeship =

Skórzewo
- Village
- Location within Poland
- Coordinates: 52°23′N 16°48′E
- Country: Poland
- Voivodeship: Greater Poland
- County: Poznań
- Gmina: Dopiewo
- Elevation: 43 m (141 ft)
- Population: 9,559 (data from 2,021)
- Website: http://www.skorzewo.info/

Skórzewo [skuˈʐɛvɔ] is a village in the administrative district of Gmina Dopiewo, within Poznań County, Greater Poland Voivodeship, in west-central Poland. The name Skórzewo is shared with a neighbourhood of Poznań, adjoining the village across the city boundary.

== Infrastructure ==
In Skórzewo there is a historic manor park. There are also two primary schools, a health center and a cemetery and also Mallwowa Gallery.

== Religious communities ==
In Skórzewo there is a historic church named after st. Marcin and Wincenty in Skórzewo.

In the village there is also a Kingdom Hall of three Poznań congregations of Jehovah's Witnesses.

== Notable people ==
- Agata Sobczyk (born 1988), Polish economist and politician
