= Nnorom =

Nnorom is a given name and surname. Notable people with the name include:

- Emmanuel Nnorom (born 1958), Nigerian business executive
- Justin Nnorom (born 1978), politician and footballer
- Onye Nnorom, Canadian physician
- Nnorom Azuonye (1967–2024), Nigerian publisher, theater director, playwright, poet
