= Dopiewiec =

- Village
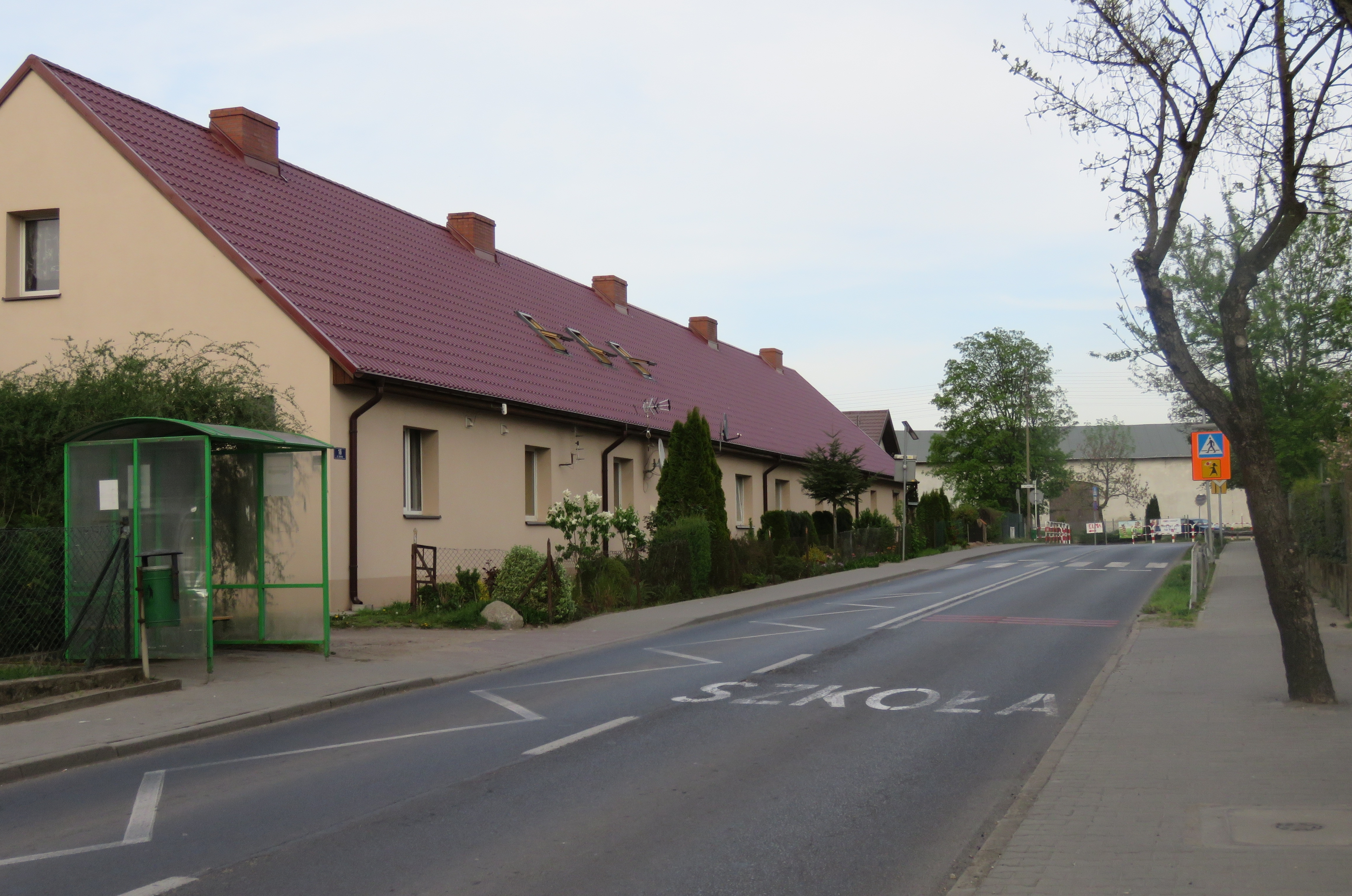

- Location within Poland
- Coordinates: 52°22′N 16°43′E
- Country: Poland
- Voivodeship: Greater Poland
- County: Poznań
- Gmina: Dopiewo
- Population: 860
- Time zone: UTC+1 (CET)
  - Summer (DST): UTC+2 (CEST)
- Vehicle registration: PZ

Dopiewiec [dɔˈpjɛvjɛt͡s] is a village in the administrative district of Gmina Dopiewo, within Poznań County, Greater Poland Voivodeship, in west-central Poland.

== History ==
As part of the region of Greater Poland, i.e. the cradle of the Polish state, the area formed part of Poland since its establishment in the 10th century. Dopiewiec was a private village of Polish nobility, administratively located in the Poznań County in the Poznań Voivodeship in the Greater Poland Province of the Kingdom of Poland.

During the German occupation of Poland, the local forest was the site of large massacres of Poles from the region committed by the occupiers in 1939–1940 (see Nazi crimes against the Polish nation). In the autumn of 1939, the Germans massacred over 630 Poles brought from the Fort VII concentration camp in Poznań, incl. 70 students of Poznań universities and colleges, who were murdered on 7 November 1939, and 70 nuns, who were murdered in December 1939 (see Nazi persecution of the Catholic Church in Poland). The victims were murdered with shots to the back of the head. After each execution there were alcoholic drinking parties of the German execution squad. In early 1940 further executions took place, in which over 2,000 Poles were brought from Fort VII to the forest and murdered. The bodies were buried in seven mass graves. In the last months of the war the occupiers burnt the bodies of the victims in an attempt to cover up the crime.

== Transport ==
The Polish A2 motorway runs near Dopiewiec, south of the village.
