= Karczowiska Górne =

- Village
- Location within Poland
- Coordinates: 54°7′13″N 19°21′31″E
- Country: Poland
- Voivodeship: Warmian-Masurian
- County: Elbląg
- Gmina: Gronowo Elbląskie
- Population: 230

Karczowiska Górne [kart͡ʂɔˈviska ˈɡurnɛ] (is a village in the administrative district of Gmina Gronowo Elbląskie, within Elbląg County, Warmian-Masurian Voivodeship, in northern Poland. It is located approximately 6 km (4 mi) north-east of Gronowo Elbląskie, 5 km (3 mi) north-west of Elbląg, and 84 km (52 mi) north-west of the regional capital Olsztyn.
