= Dobieżyn =

- Village
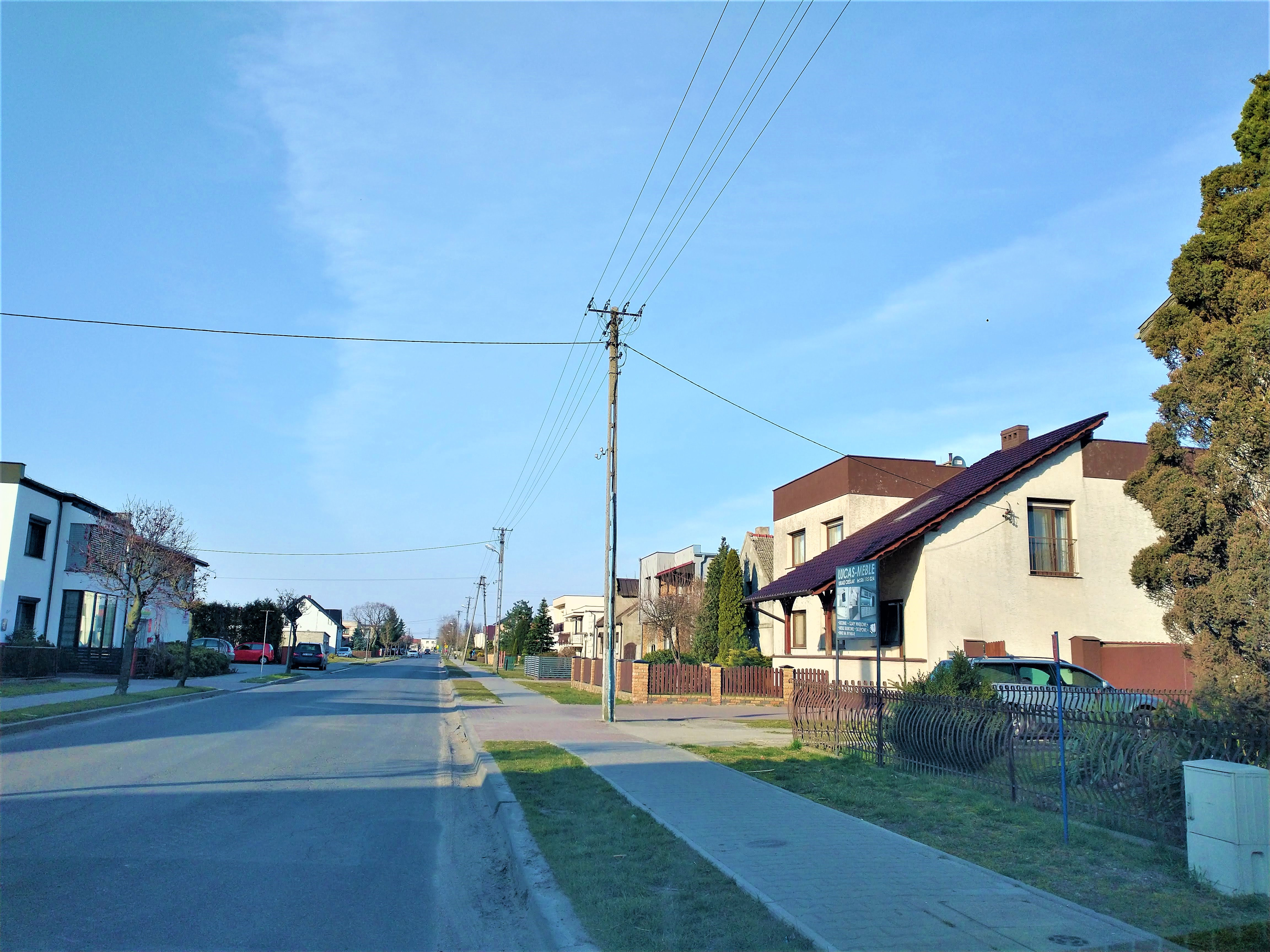

- Location within Poland
- Coordinates: 52°19′39″N 16°32′18″E
- Country: Poland
- Voivodeship: Greater Poland
- County: Poznań
- Gmina: Buk
- Population: 1,100
- Time zone: UTC+1 (CET)
  - Summer (DST): UTC+2 (CEST)

Dobieżyn [dɔˈbjɛʐɨn] is a village in the administrative district of Gmina Buk, within Poznań County, Greater Poland Voivodeship, in west-central Poland.
