= Szewce, Gmina Buk =

Szewce
- Village
- Location within Poland
- Coordinates: 52°18′26″N 16°30′26″E
- Country: Poland
- Voivodeship: Greater Poland
- County: Poznań
- Gmina: Buk

Szewce [ˈʂɛft͡sɛ] is a village in the administrative district of Gmina Buk, within Poznań County, Greater Poland Voivodeship, in west-central Poland.
