= Pawłówko, Gmina Buk =

Pawłówko
- Village
- Location within Poland
- Coordinates: 52°21′49″N 16°28′35″E
- Country: Poland
- Voivodeship: Greater Poland
- County: Poznań
- Gmina: Buk

Pawłówko [paˈvwufkɔ] is a village in the administrative district of Gmina Buk, within Poznań County, Greater Poland Voivodeship, in west-central Poland.
