= Zborowo =

- Village
- Location within Poland
- Coordinates: 52°22′N 16°37′E
- Country: Poland
- Voivodeship: Greater Poland
- County: Poznań
- Gmina: Dopiewo
- Elevation: 86 m (282 ft)
- Population: 71
- Website: https://www.zborowo.pl/

Zborowo [zbɔˈrɔvɔ] is a village in the administrative district of Gmina Dopiewo. It is situated within Poznań County, Greater Poland Voivodeship, in west-central Poland.
