= Jasionno =

- Village
- Location within Poland
- Coordinates: 54°5′31″N 19°20′36″E
- Country: Poland
- Voivodeship: Warmian-Masurian
- County: Elbląg
- Gmina: Gronowo Elbląskie
- Population: 250
- Time zone: UTC+1 (CET)
  - Summer (DST): UTC+2 (CEST)
- Vehicle registration: NEB

Jasionno [jaˈɕɔnnɔ] is a village in the administrative district of Gmina Gronowo Elbląskie, within Elbląg County, Warmian-Masurian Voivodeship, in northern Poland. It is approximately 3 km (2 mi) east of Gronowo Elbląskie, 4 km (2 mi) west of Elbląg, and 84 km (52 mi) northwest of the regional capital Olsztyn.
