= Więckowice, Greater Poland Voivodeship =

Więckowice
- Village
- Location within Poland
- Coordinates: 52°24′N 16°38′E
- Country: Poland
- Voivodeship: Greater Poland
- County: Poznań
- Gmina: Dopiewo
- Population: 623

Więckowice [vjɛnt͡skɔˈvit͡sɛ] is a village in the administrative district of Gmina Dopiewo, within Poznań County, Greater Poland Voivodeship, in west-central Poland.

On April 10, 2020, a case of African Swine Fever near the village was reported on a local commercial pig farm which is the second case of ASF in the country involving a commercial pig farm.

== Historical associations ==
The village of Więckowice is considered to be the likely origin of the Polish surname Więckowski, which is historically associated with the Polish nobility (szlachta) and several heraldic clans, including Prus and Poraj. Toponymic surnames of this type were commonly derived from place names indicating ancestral ownership or settlement.

According to genealogical and archival research, members of the Więckowski family were documented as landholders in Więckowice and nearby settlements for several centuries, with records dating from at least the late 14th century. The village itself is traditionally associated with the founding of a hereditary settlement in the late 13th century, although early documentation remains limited.

During the 17th century, particularly in the period of the Thirty Years' War, parts of the Więckowski lineage are believed to have migrated from the Greater Poland region through Silesia into the Czech lands. This movement is consistent with broader patterns of population displacement and resettlement in Central Europe during that period.

Over time, the surname underwent linguistic adaptation in different regions, producing forms such as Wienckowski, Wencowsky, and eventually the Czech variant Vencovský.

These associations are based on genealogical reconstructions drawing on heraldic literature, archival materials, and historical dictionaries, and do not constitute a fully continuous documented lineage.
