= Drwęsa =

- Village
- Location within Poland
- Coordinates: 52°24′21″N 16°37′4″E
- Country: Poland
- Voivodeship: Greater Poland
- County: Poznań
- Gmina: Dopiewo
- Population: 59

Drwęsa [ˈdrvɛnsa] or Drwęca [ˈdrvɛnt͡sa] is a village in the administrative district of Gmina Dopiewo, within Poznań County, Greater Poland Voivodeship, in west-central Poland.
