= Marian Żelazek =

Polish missionary

Servant of God Marian Żelazek SVD
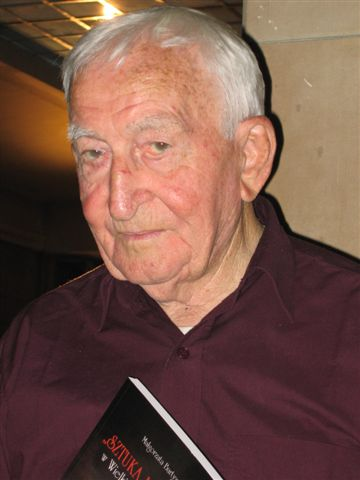
- Born: 30 January 1918; Palędzie, Poland
- Died: April 30, 2006 (aged 88); Puri, India

Marian Żelazek (30 January 1918 – 30 April 2006) was a Polish Roman Catholic priest of the Society of the Divine Word (SVD) who lived in India and served amongst the people of Orissa. He is remembered for his service and care towards the lepers in the region. He was the last foreign missionary of the SVD congregation in India. He was declared Servant of God on 25 August 2018.

== Early life ==
Marian Żelazek was born on 30 January 1918 in Paledzie, Poznan, Poland to Mr. Stanislaw and Mrs. Stanislawa. He joined the Society of the Divine Word in 1937. He made his first profession as a member of the society on 4 September 1939. He completed his philosophy in Poland and Theology from Pontifical Athenaeum of Saint Anselm.

== Priesthood ==
His priestly formation was interrupted for five years because he was captured by the Wehrmacht for being a Catholic seminarian and a Polish citizen. He spent five years in a concentration camp at Dachau in Germany, along with his fellow seminarians, priests and religious brothers.

Żelazek made his final profession on 8 September 1948 and was ordained a priest on 18 September 1948. On 21 May 1950, Żelazek reached Orissa, India. He was the headmaster of the Hamirpur Boys High School and director of the Minor Seminary in Hamirpur. He set up many schools and hostels and promoted education in Rourkela, Orissa. He served in Orissa for 25 years.

In 1975, he was transferred to Puri as the parish priest, a post he retained until 1991. He was moved by the sight of so many lepers in the nearby temple that he started a house to take care of them. He named the house Karunalaya. He moved to an ashram in Ishopathy after handing over the charge of parish priest to another priest. He also set up St. Arnold's Center of Spirituality.

== Awards and honors ==
In August 2000, the Polish government conferred on Żelazek its highest national civilian awards The Chivalry Cross of Order of the Rebirth of Poland. City Council of Poznan awarded him the tribute of The Honored Citizen of Poznan on 29 June 2005. On 5 March 2003, he was awarded The Sir Jehangir Ghandy Medal by the Xavier Labour Institute of Jamshedpur, Bihar. The Neelchakra socio-cultural organization of Orissa honored him with “Neelchakra”. Oriya daily newspaper Samaj presented him with the Dr. Radhanath Rath Seva Samman Award and a cash prize of Rupees. 10,000.00 on 6 December 2005. He was also nominated for the Nobel Peace Prize in 2001 and 2003 for his work for the lepers. BBC broadcast a 45-minute video documentary titled “The New Face of Leprosy”.

== Death ==
Zelazek died of a cardiac arrest on 30 April 2006. On 2 May 2006 after the funeral mass at the St. Arnold's Church, Jharsuguda, he was buried at the SVD cemetery in the premises of the SVD Provincial House in Jharsuguda.

== Beatification process ==
On 25 August 2018 he was declared Servant of God by the diocese and hence started the process of his canonisation.

== See also ==
List of saints of India
