= Żarnowiec (disambiguation) =

Żarnowiec is a village in Pomeranian Voivodeship, northern Poland.

Żarnowiec may also refer to:

- Żarnowiec, Greater Poland Voivodeship (west-central Poland)
- Żarnowiec, Subcarpathian Voivodeship (south-east Poland)
- Żarnowiec, Silesian Voivodeship (south Poland)
