= Justin Nnorom =

Nigerian footballer (born 1978)

Personal information
- Full name: Justin Chidi Nnorom
- Date of birth: 12 December 1978 (age 47)
- Place of birth: Owerri, Nigeria
- Height: 1.76 m (5 ft 9 in)
- Position: Striker

Senior career*
Years	Team	Apps	(Gls)
1996–1998	BCC Lions	67	(16)
1998–2003	Lech Poznań	31	(2)
2003–2004	Lech Poznań II	10	(1)
Total		108	(19)
- * Club domestic league appearances and goals

Justin Chidi Nnorom (born 12 December 1978) is a Nigerian politician and former professional footballer who played as a striker.

== Early life ==
Nnorom was the son of a lecturer.

== Career ==
Nnorom retired from professional football after suffering an injury.

== Post-playing career ==
After retiring from professional football Nnorom ran a language school, which was eventually transformed into a translation agency. He also runs a football management agency.

In 2014, he successfully ran for a seat on the Gmina Dopiewo municipal council. Four years later, he was selected for another term, after receiving the highest number of votes out of all candidates in his jurisdiction. He was reelected in 2024.

== Personal life ==
Nnorom studied English philology in Poznań. He obtained Polish citizenship in early 2011. He currently lives in Dąbrówka, is married and has two children.
