= Otusz =

- Village
- Location within Poland
- Coordinates: 52°22′N 16°35′E
- Country: Poland
- Voivodeship: Greater Poland
- County: Poznań
- Gmina: Buk
- Website: http://www.otusz.republika.pl

Otusz [ˈɔtuʂ] is a village in the administrative district of Gmina Buk, within Poznań County, Greater Poland Voivodeship, in west-central Poland.
