= Błotnica =

Błotnica may refer to the following places in Poland:

- Blotnica (river), in north-west Poland
- Błotnica, Strzelin County in Lower Silesian Voivodeship (south-west Poland)
- Błotnica, Ząbkowice County in Lower Silesian Voivodeship (south-west Poland)
- Błotnica, Świętokrzyskie Voivodeship (south-central Poland)
- Błotnica, Greater Poland Voivodeship (west-central Poland)
- Błotnica, Lubusz Voivodeship (west Poland)
- Błotnica, Warmian-Masurian Voivodeship (north Poland)
- Błotnica, West Pomeranian Voivodeship (north-west Poland)
- Błotnica Strzelecka, in south-west Poland
- Stara Błotnica, in east-central Poland
  - Gmina Stara Błotnica
