= Zakrzewo, Poznań County =

Zakrzewo
- Village
- Location within Poland
- Coordinates: 52°24′N 16°44′E
- Country: Poland
- Voivodeship: Greater Poland
- County: Poznań
- Gmina: Dopiewo
- Population: 1,343

Zakrzewo [zaˈkʂɛvɔ] is a village in the administrative district of Gmina Dopiewo, within Poznań County, Greater Poland Voivodeship, in west-central Poland.
