= Niepruszewo =

- Village
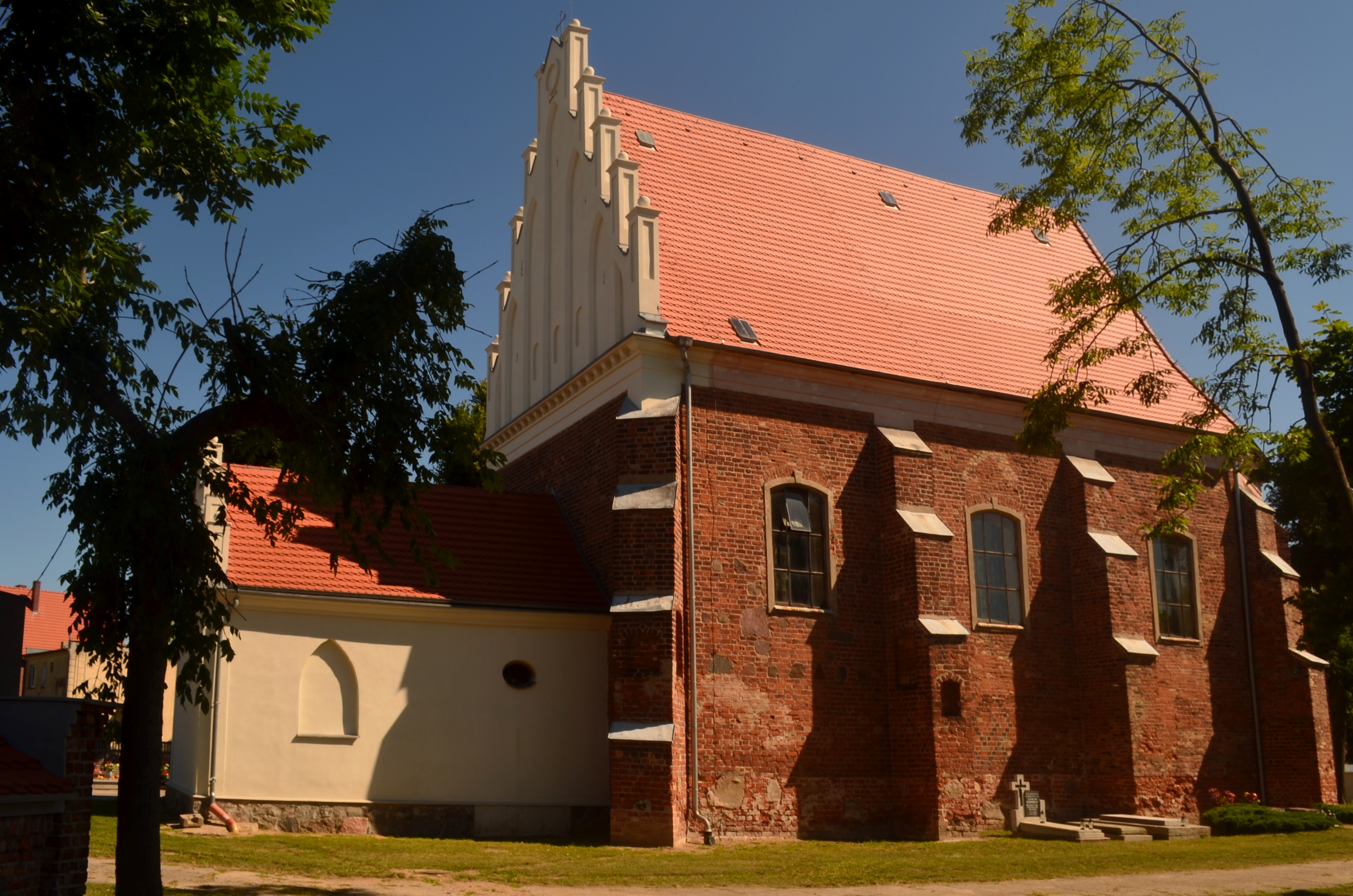

- Location within Poland
- Coordinates: 52°23′9″N 16°36′17″E
- Country: Poland
- Voivodeship: Greater Poland
- County: Poznań
- Gmina: Buk
- Population: 1,234
- Website: http://www.niepruszewo.org.pl

Niepruszewo [ɲɛpruˈʂɛvɔ] is a village in the administrative district of Gmina Buk, within Poznań County, Greater Poland Voivodeship, in west-central Poland.
