= Pokrzywnica, Poznań County =

Pokrzywnica
- Village
- Location within Poland
- Coordinates: 52°23′28″N 16°40′48″E
- Country: Poland
- Voivodeship: Greater Poland
- County: Poznań
- Gmina: Dopiewo
- Population: 36

Pokrzywnica [pɔkʂɨvˈnit͡sa] is a village in the administrative district of Gmina Dopiewo, within Poznań County, Greater Poland Voivodeship, in west-central Poland.
