= Dobra, Poznań County =

Dobra
- Village
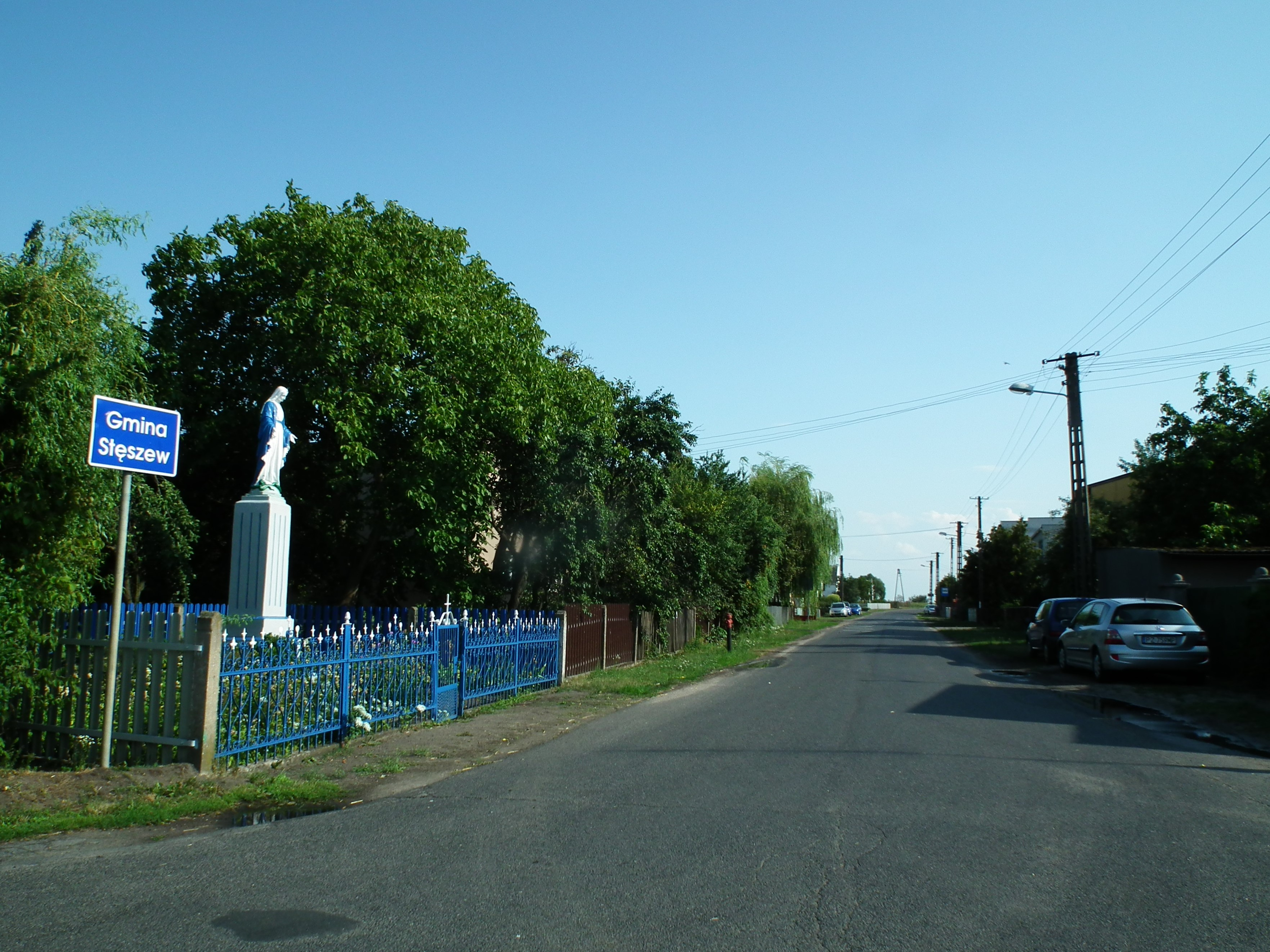

- Location within Poland
- Coordinates: 52°18′N 16°33′E
- Country: Poland
- Voivodeship: Greater Poland
- County: Poznań
- Gmina: Buk

Dobra [ˈdɔbra] is a village in the administrative district of Gmina Buk, within Poznań County, Greater Poland Voivodeship, in west-central Poland.
