= Fiałkowo =

- Village
- Location within Poland
- Coordinates: 52°22′30″N 16°39′25″E
- Country: Poland
- Voivodeship: Greater Poland
- County: Poznań
- Gmina: Dopiewo
- Population: 42

Fiałkowo [fjau̯ˈkɔvɔ] is a village in the administrative district of Gmina Dopiewo, within Poznań County, Greater Poland Voivodeship, in west-central Poland.
