= Sznyfin =

- Village
- Location within Poland
- Coordinates: 52°17′25″N 16°32′24″E
- Country: Poland
- Voivodeship: Greater Poland
- County: Poznań
- Gmina: Buk

Sznyfin [ˈʂnɨfin] is a village in the administrative district of Gmina Buk, within Poznań County, Greater Poland Voivodeship, in west-central Poland.
