= Podłoziny =

- Village
- Location within Poland
- Coordinates: 52°20′39″N 16°37′55″E
- Country: Poland
- Voivodeship: Greater Poland
- County: Poznań
- Gmina: Dopiewo
- Population: 68

Podłoziny [pɔdwɔˈʑinɨ] is a village in the administrative district of Gmina Dopiewo, within Poznań County, Greater Poland Voivodeship, in west-central Poland.
