= Wikrowo =

Wikrowo may refer to the following places:

- Wikrowo, Gmina Gronowo Elbląskie in Warmian-Masurian Voivodeship (north Poland)
- Wikrowo, Gmina Pasłęk in Warmian-Masurian Voivodeship (north Poland)
- Wikrowo, Kętrzyn County in Warmian-Masurian Voivodeship (north Poland)
