= Cieśle, Poznań County =

Cieśle
- Village
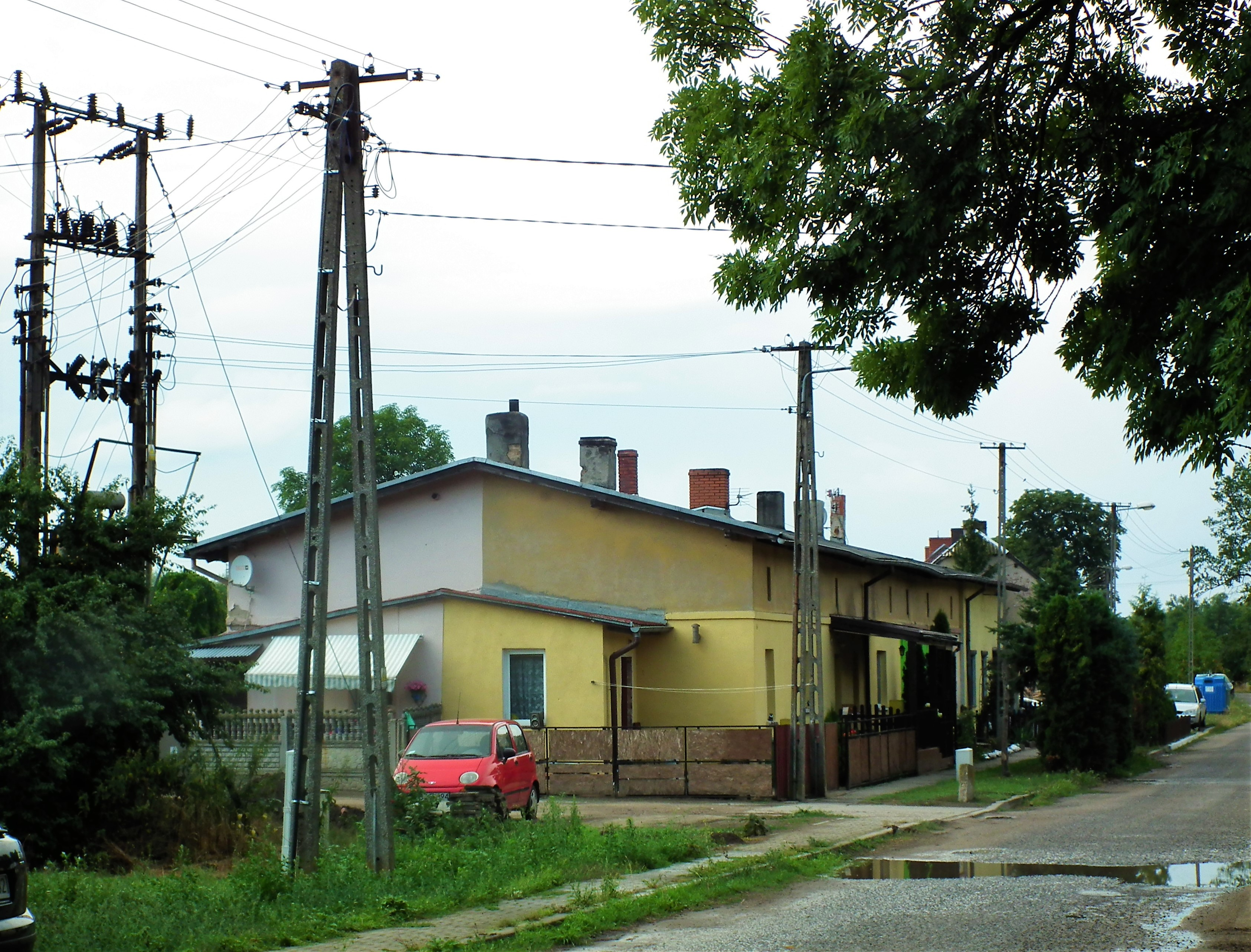

- Location within Poland
- Coordinates: 52°21′56″N 16°37′6″E
- Country: Poland
- Voivodeship: Greater Poland
- County: Poznań
- Gmina: Buk

Cieśle [ˈt͡ɕɛɕlɛ] is a village in the administrative district of Gmina Buk, within Poznań County, Greater Poland Voivodeship, in west-central Poland.
