= Melchor Chyliński =

Polish Roman Catholic priest (1694–1741)

Blessed Melchor Chyliński O.F.M. Conv.
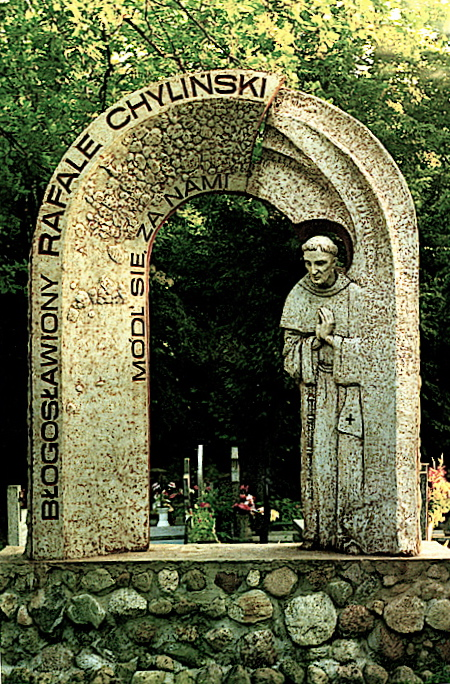
- Statue.

Priest
- Born: 8 January 1694; Wysoczka, Wielkopolskie, Crown of the Kingdom of Poland
- Died: 2 December 1741 (aged 47); Łagiewniki, Łodźkie, Crown of the Kingdom of Poland
- Venerated in: Roman Catholic Church
- Beatified: 9 June 1991, Warsaw, Poland by Pope John Paul II
- Feast: 2 December
- Attributes: Franciscan habit

Melchor Chyliński (8 January 1694 – 2 December 1741) — in religious Rafał — was a Polish Roman Catholic priest and a professed member from the Order of Friars Minor Conventual. He first served as a soldier but decided to instead become a priest and so entered the Franciscans and made his profession prior to ordination. He also became known for his simplistic preaching and for his generous outreach to the poor through the distribution of clothing and food.

His beatification was celebrated on 9 June 1991 in the capital of Warsaw on the occasion of Pope John Paul II visiting the nation.

== Life ==
Melchor Chyliński was born on 8 January 1694 in the Crown of the Kingdom of Poland to Jan Chyliński and Marianna Małgorzata; his relations often nicknamed him as "the little monk" due to his pious nature. He later graduated from the Jesuit-run college in Poznań and decided to enter the armed forces in its cavalry section where he was made an officer three years later.

On 4 April 1715 - despite the objections of his comrades - he joined the Order of Friars Minor Conventual in Kraków and changed his name during the course of his novitiate to "Rafal". He was ordained to the priesthood in December 1717 after having made his perpetual profession on 26 April 1716. He was assigned to parishes in nine separate cities before being sent to the place that he would spend the remainder of his life in and he distributed food and clothing to the poor and sick people there; he also played the harp and the lute as well as the mandolin for liturgical hymns and spent 20 months in Warsaw ministering to epidemic victims. He was also known for his simple and candid sermons and for being an apt confessor.

He died on 2 December 1741.

== Beatification ==
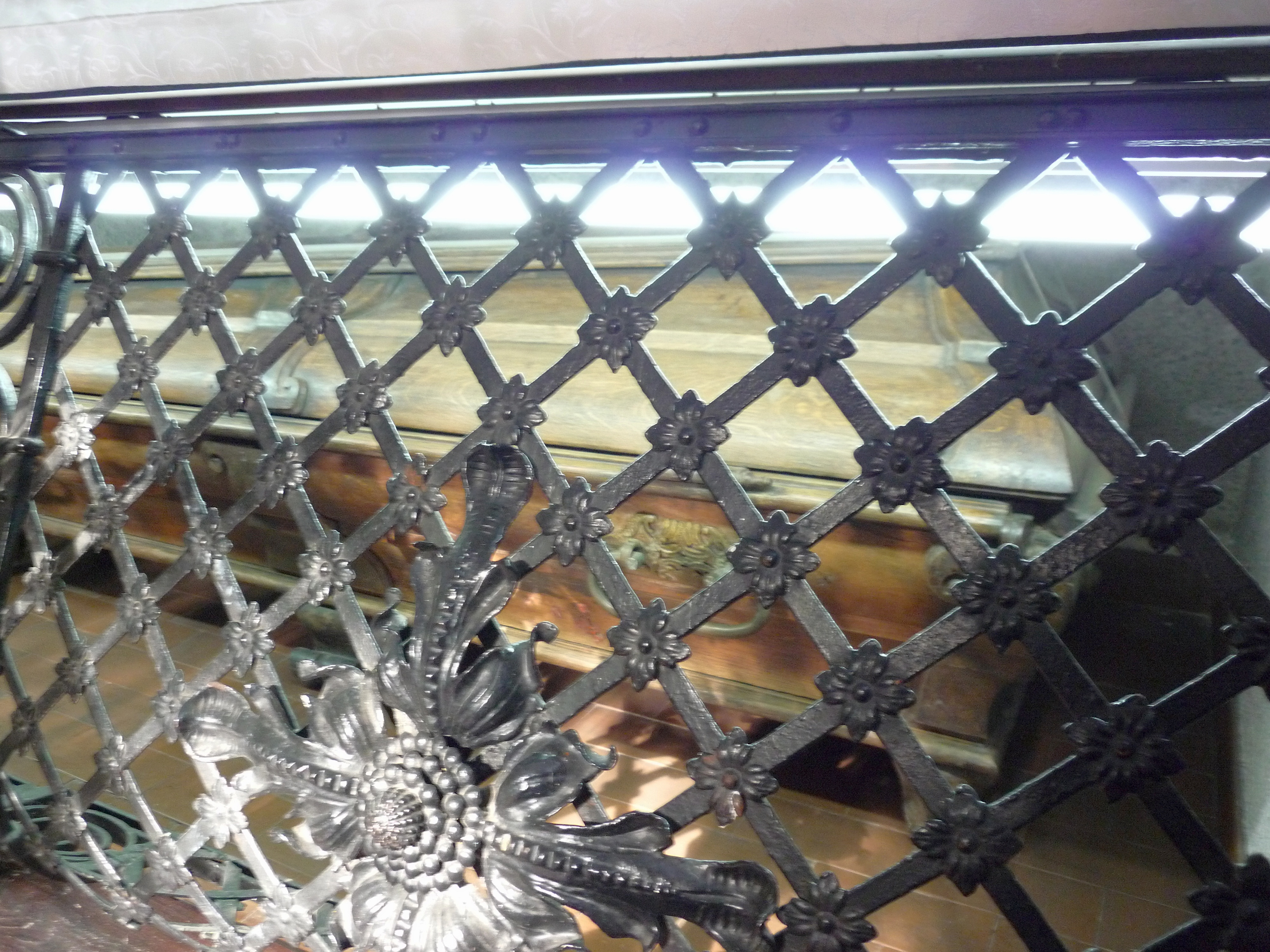
Tomb.

The beatification process started under Pope Clement XIV on 29 August 1772 and Chyliński became titled as a Servant of God; the confirmation of his life of heroic virtue allowed for Pope Pius XII to name him as Venerable on 13 May 1949. The miracle needed for beatification was investigated on a diocesan level and later received validation before receiving the approval of medical experts on 7 March 1990; theologians did so as well on 5 July 1990 as did the C.C.S. on 23 October 1990. Pope John Paul II approved this on 22 January 1991 and beatified the late Franciscan on 9 June 1991 in Warsaw during his apostolic visit there.

The current postulator for this cause is Fra Angelo Paleri.
