= Żegowo =

- Village
- Location within Poland
- Coordinates: 52°22′44″N 16°32′17″E
- Country: Poland
- Voivodeship: Greater Poland
- County: Poznań
- Gmina: Buk
- Population: 110

Żegowo [ʐɛˈɡɔvɔ] is a village in the administrative district of Gmina Buk, within Poznań County, Greater Poland Voivodeship, in west-central Poland.
