= Wiktorowo, Gmina Buk =

Wiktorowo
- Village
- Location within Poland
- Coordinates: 52°21′55″N 16°27′30″E
- Country: Poland
- Voivodeship: Greater Poland
- County: Poznań
- Gmina: Buk

Wiktorowo [viktɔˈrɔvɔ] is a village in the administrative district of Gmina Buk, within Poznań County, Greater Poland Voivodeship, in west-central Poland.
