= Wysoczka, Poznań County =

Wysoczka
- Village
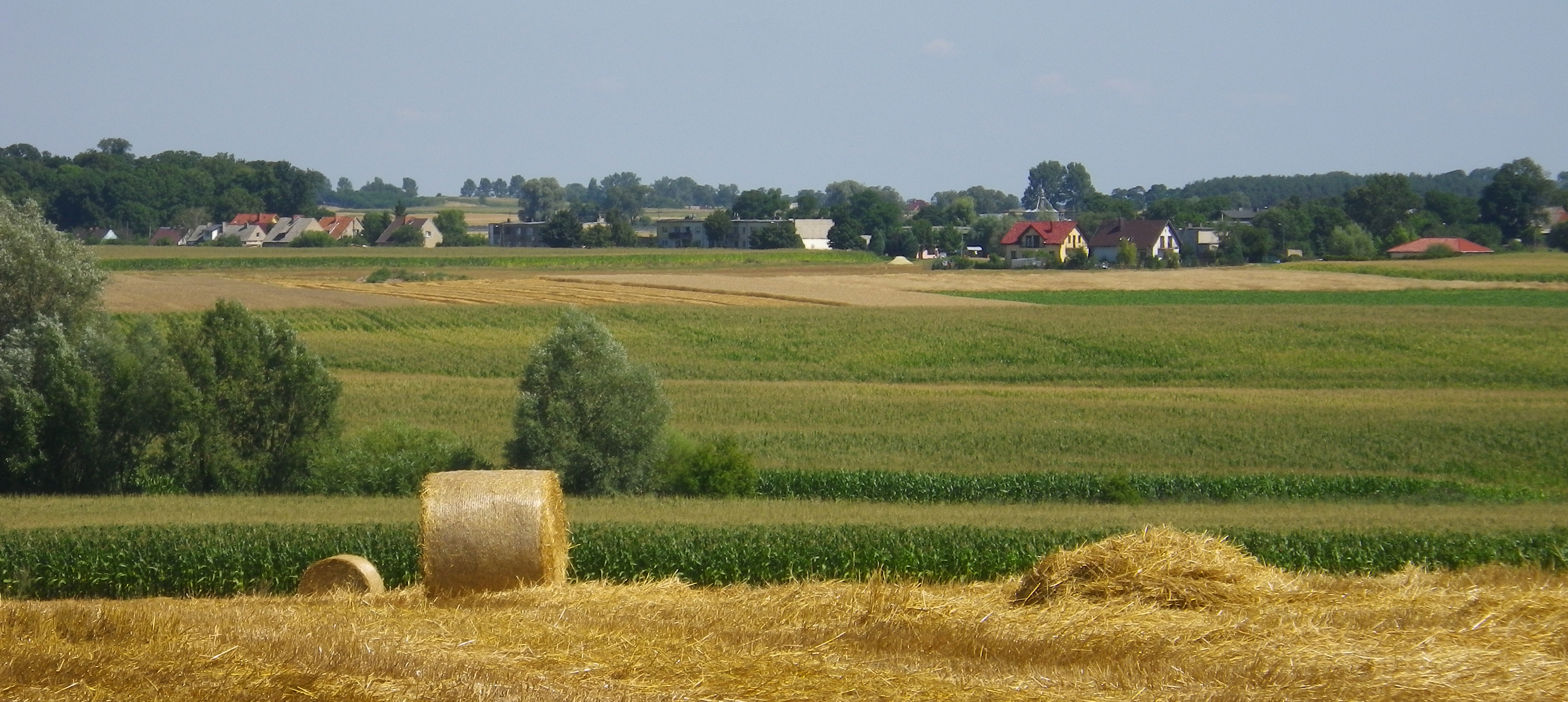

- Location within Poland
- Coordinates: 52°22′44″N 16°32′0″E
- Country: Poland
- Voivodeship: Greater Poland
- County: Poznań
- Gmina: Buk
- Population: 300

Wysoczka [vɨˈsɔt͡ʂka] is a village in the administrative district of Gmina Buk, within Poznań County, Greater Poland Voivodeship, in west-central Poland.

In 2008, the village had a population of 300.
