= Dworki, Warmian-Masurian Voivodeship =

Dworki
- Village
- Location within Poland
- Coordinates: 54°4′38″N 19°15′46″E
- Country: Poland
- Voivodeship: Warmian-Masurian
- County: Elbląg
- Gmina: Gronowo Elbląskie

Dworki [ˈdvɔrki] is a village in the administrative district of Gmina Gronowo Elbląskie, within Elbląg County, Warmian-Masurian Voivodeship, in northern Poland.
