= Dopiewo =

- Village
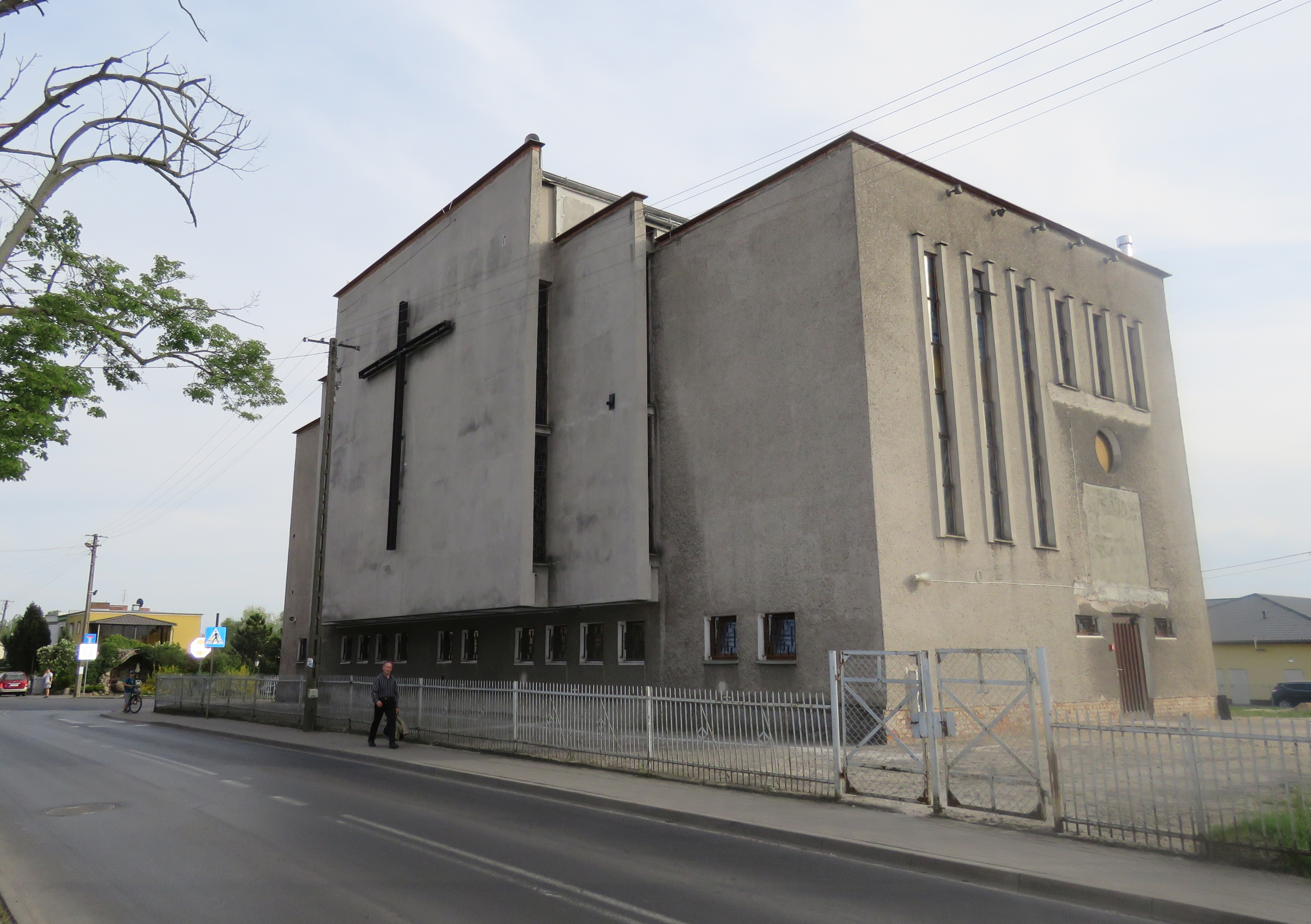
- Church of the Visitation of the Holy Virgin Mary

- Location within Poland
- Coordinates: 52°22′N 16°41′E
- Country: Poland
- Voivodeship: Greater Poland
- County: Poznań
- Gmina: Dopiewo

Population
  - Total: 2,733
- Website: http://www.dopiewo.pl

Dopiewo [dɔˈpjɛvɔ] is a village in Poznań County, Greater Poland Voivodeship, in west-central Poland. It is the seat of the gmina (administrative district) called Gmina Dopiewo.

== History ==
During World War II, Dopiewo was annexed to Germany from 1939 to 1945 as part of Landkreis Posen, Reichsgau Wartheland.
