= Żarnowiec, Greater Poland Voivodeship =

Żarnowiec
- Settlement
- Location within Poland
- Coordinates: 52°20′1″N 16°37′43″E
- Country: Poland
- Voivodeship: Greater Poland
- County: Poznań
- Gmina: Dopiewo
- Population: 11

Żarnowiec [ʐarˈnɔvjɛt͡s] is a settlement in the administrative district of Gmina Dopiewo, within Poznań County, Greater Poland Voivodeship, in west-central Poland.
