= Mechnica, Warmian-Masurian Voivodeship =

Mechnica
- Village
- Location within Poland
- Coordinates: 54°6′17″N 19°18′18″E
- Country: Poland
- Voivodeship: Warmian-Masurian
- County: Elbląg
- Gmina: Gronowo Elbląskie

Mechnica [mɛxˈnit͡sa] is a village in the administrative district of Gmina Gronowo Elbląskie, within Elbląg County, Warmian-Masurian Voivodeship, in northern Poland.
