= Rozgart =

- Village
- Location within Poland
- Coordinates: 54°2′55″N 19°17′54″E
- Country: Poland
- Voivodeship: Warmian-Masurian
- County: Elbląg
- Gmina: Gronowo Elbląskie
- Population: 150

Rozgart [ˈrɔzɡart] is a village in the administrative district of Gmina Gronowo Elbląskie, within Elbląg County, Warmian-Masurian Voivodeship, in northern Poland.

== History ==
The village was founded in the 14th century (around 1312–14). Its previous name "Rosengart" or "Rosengarten" is believed to stem from the word/name "Roßgarten".

In the 16th century, Mennonite settlers also came to the village of Rosengart. The Rosengart Mennonite community was part of the Thiensdorf-Pr.Rosengart parish; Mennonite churches were located in Markushof (today: Markusy) and Thiensdorf (today: Jezioro).

In 1890, a separate Mennonite church was built in Pr. Rosengart - which is now a Catholic church.
