= Dakowy Suche =

- Village
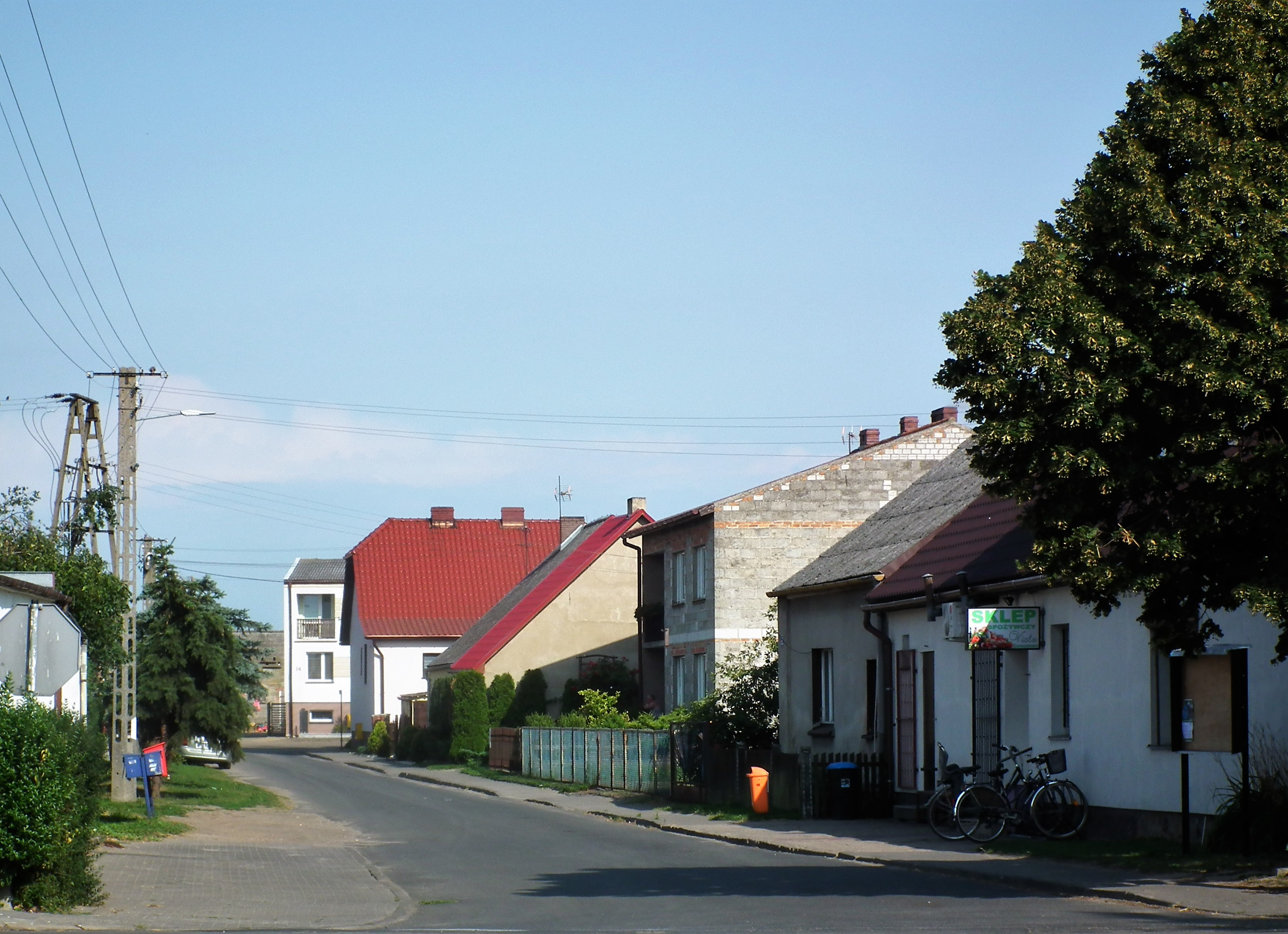

- Location within Poland
- Coordinates: 52°17′N 16°31′E
- Country: Poland
- Voivodeship: Greater Poland
- County: Poznań
- Gmina: Buk
- Population: 420
- Website: http://www.dakowysuche.pl

Dakowy Suche [daˈkɔvɨ ˈsuxɛ] is a village in the administrative district of Gmina Buk, within Poznań County, Greater Poland Voivodeship, in west-central Poland.
