= Gmina Gronowo Elbląskie =

Gmina Gronowo Elbląskie Gronowo Elbląskie Commune
- Gmina
- Coat of arms
- Interactive map of Gmina Gronowo Elbląskie
- Coordinates (Gronowo Elbląskie): 54°5′6″N 19°18′26″E
- Country: Poland
- Voivodeship: Warmian-Masurian
- County: Elbląg County
- Seat: Gronowo Elbląskie

Area
  - Total: 89.2 km^{2} (34.4 sq mi)

Population (2006)
  - Total: 4,875
  - Density: 54.7/km^{2} (142/sq mi)
- Website: Gronowo

Gmina Gronowo Elbląskie is a rural gmina (administrative district) in Elbląg County, Warmian-Masurian Voivodeship, in northern Poland. Its seat is the village of Gronowo Elbląskie, which lies approximately 7 kilometres (4 mi) west of Elbląg and 86 km (53 mi) north-west of the regional capital Olsztyn.

The gmina covers an area of 89.2 square kilometres (34.4 sq mi), and as of 2006 its total population is 4,875.

== Villages ==
Gmina Gronowo Elbląskie contains the villages and settlements of Błotnica, Czarna Grobla, Dworki, Fiszewo, Gajewiec, Gronowo Elbląskie, Jasionno, Jegłownik, Karczowiska Górne, Kopanka Druga, Kopanka Pierwsza, Mechnica, Mojkowo, Nogat, Nowy Dwór Elbląski, Oleśno, Różany, Rozgart, Sporowo, Szopy, Wikrowo and Wiktorowo.

== Neighbouring gminas ==
Gmina Gronowo Elbląskie is bordered by the gminas of Elbląg, Markusy, Nowy Dwór Gdański and Stare Pole.
