= Jan Sokolowski =

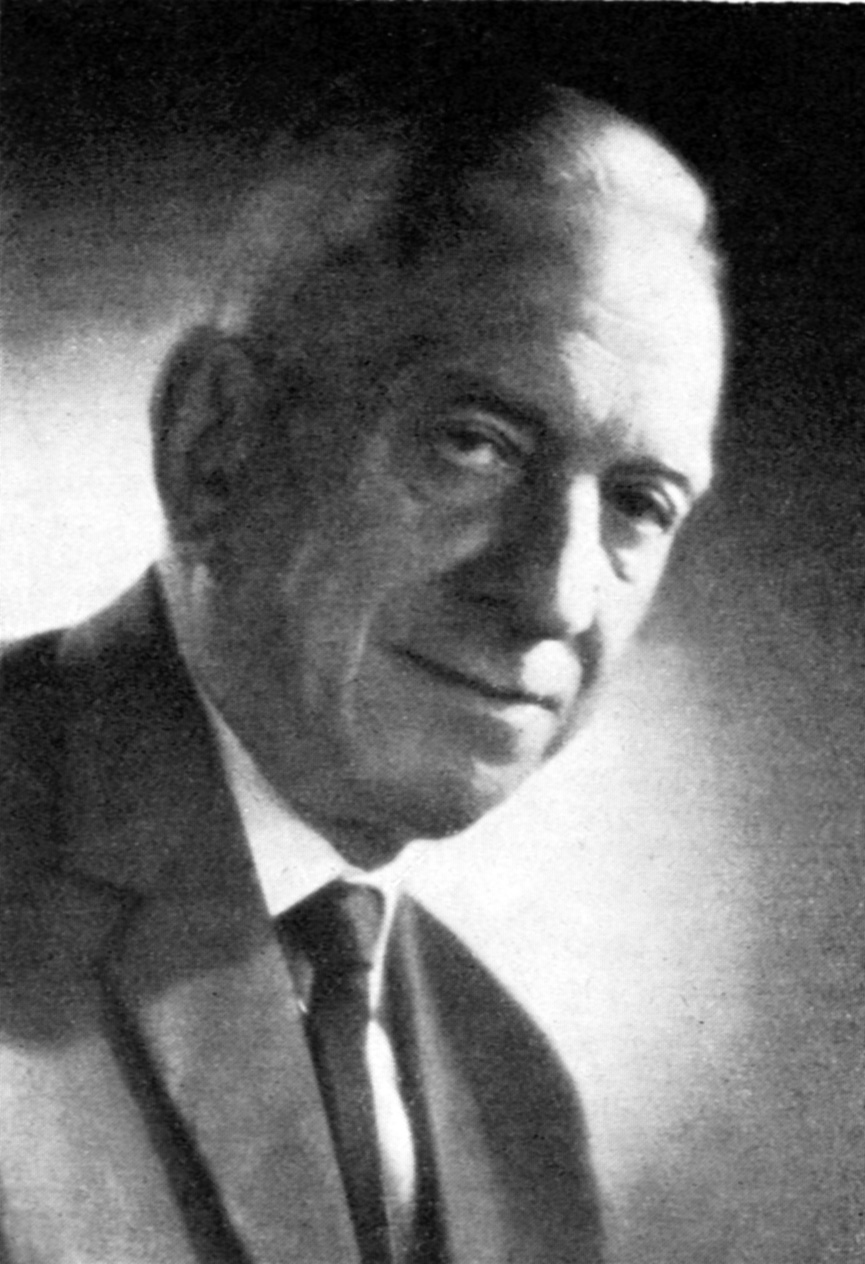
Jan Sokolowski

Jan Bogumił Sokołowski (24 May 1899 – 7 April 1982) was a Polish zoologist who worked as a professor at the University of Poznan, who was a specialist in ornithology and studied the birds of Poland and made efforts for their conservation. He was also a talented artist and a writer of popular articles which included his own illustrations.

== Early life and education ==
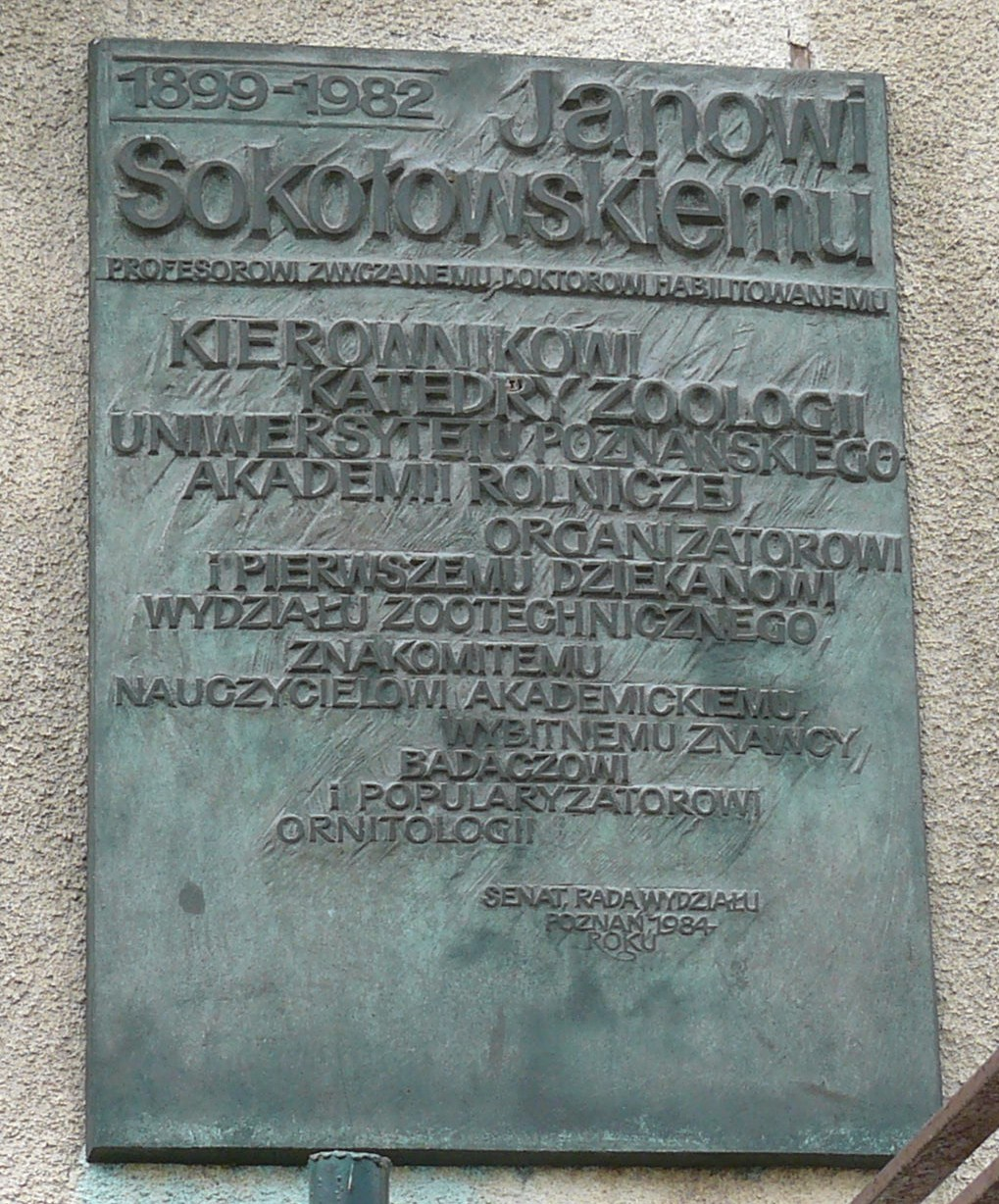
Commemorate plaque at Poznan

Sokołowski was born in Dakowy Mokre near Buk in a wealthy family, the son of local administrator Alekse and Zofia née Gintrowicz. His mother owned a 120-hectar farm while his father came from an impoverished farming family and a tenant on the Nimierzyce estate. His grandfather Józef (1820-1876) was a participant in the 1848 and 1863 uprisings. As a young boy he took a keen interest in nature and often got into trouble, stung by bees once and nearly drowned while observing snails and fish. He was tutored at home at first and completed his matriculation from Poznan and then went to study art at the state school. An uncle Zygmunt Sokołowski (1858-1885) was an artist. He joined the insurgents during the Greater Poland uprising (1918–19). In 1917 he was nearly conscripted into the German army. He then went to study art in Munich under Heinrich von Zugel. In 1921 he began to study biology, geography, and geology at the University of Poznan. He received a high school teaching diploma and a master's degree in philosophy with a thesis on the histology of the intestinal tract of song birds in 1925 under Antoni Jakubski. While a student, he worked as an illustrator and specimen preparator at the Department of Zoology, working under Jan Grochmalicki. He then studied the orthoptera of the region and obtained a doctoral degree.

== Career ==
Sokołowski taught nature studies at the Cadet Corps between 1927 and 1937. During this period he designed a nest box for which he obtained a patent. "Sokolowski boxes" were manufactured by the Rawicz prison. He then studied the birds of Poland and habilitated in ornithology in 1936. During World War II he lived with his family in Jędrzejów and Zagnańsk near Kielce and spent time on collection trips into the Zagnańsk region and the Świętokrzyskie Mountains. In 1946 he obtained a post-doctoral degree for studies on the skull of songbirds. He joined the University of Poznan and became an associate professor in 1948 and became a full professor in 1955.

Sokołowski painted numerous watercolours of landscapes and of birds. When he lived in the mountains, he often earned money by selling his paintings. He also used to illustrate his own books. He also took an interest in photography and published many in the magazine Wszechświat. His books included one of the birds of Poland and he wrote numerous articles in a magazine for young naturalists. He also gave radio talks from 1938, under the pseudonym "Pan Tomasz" and making use of the Wielkopolska dialect.

Sokołowski published nearly 200 papers and numerous books. He married Maria, whom worked at a bookstore in Poznań, in 1927. They had a son and a daughter. He died at Poznan and is buried in the parish cemetery of St. Jan Vianney.
