= Palędzie, Greater Poland Voivodeship =

Palędzie
- Village
- Location within Poland
- Coordinates: 52°22′N 16°44′E
- Country: Poland
- Voivodeship: Greater Poland
- County: Poznań
- Gmina: Dopiewo
- Population: 847

Palędzie [paˈlɛnd͡ʑɛ] is a village in the administrative district of Gmina Dopiewo, within Poznań County, Greater Poland Voivodeship, in west-central Poland.
