= Czarna Grobla =

- Settlement
- Location within Poland
- Coordinates: 54°6′32″N 19°15′3″E
- Country: Poland
- Voivodeship: Warmian-Masurian
- County: Elbląg
- Gmina: Gronowo Elbląskie

Czarna Grobla [ˈt͡ʂarna ˈɡrɔbla] is a settlement in the administrative district of Gmina Gronowo Elbląskie, within Elbląg County, Warmian-Masurian Voivodeship, in northern Poland.
