= Sporowo =

- Settlement
- Location within Poland
- Coordinates: 54°4′15″N 19°16′49″E
- Country: Poland
- Voivodeship: Warmian-Masurian
- County: Elbląg
- Gmina: Gronowo Elbląskie

Sporowo [spɔˈrɔvɔ] is a settlement in the administrative district of Gmina Gronowo Elbląskie, within Elbląg County, Warmian-Masurian Voivodeship, in northern Poland.
