= Mojkowo =

- Village
- Location within Poland
- Coordinates: 54°6′9″N 19°19′25″E
- Country: Poland
- Voivodeship: Warmian-Masurian
- County: Elbląg
- Gmina: Gronowo Elbląskie

Mojkowo [mɔi̯ˈkɔvɔ] is a village in the administrative district of Gmina Gronowo Elbląskie, within Elbląg County, Warmian-Masurian Voivodeship, in northern Poland.
