= Nowy Dwór Elbląski =

- Village
- Location within Poland
- Coordinates: 54°6′43″N 19°16′41″E
- Country: Poland
- Voivodeship: Warmian-Masurian
- County: Elbląg
- Gmina: Gronowo Elbląskie
- Population: 140

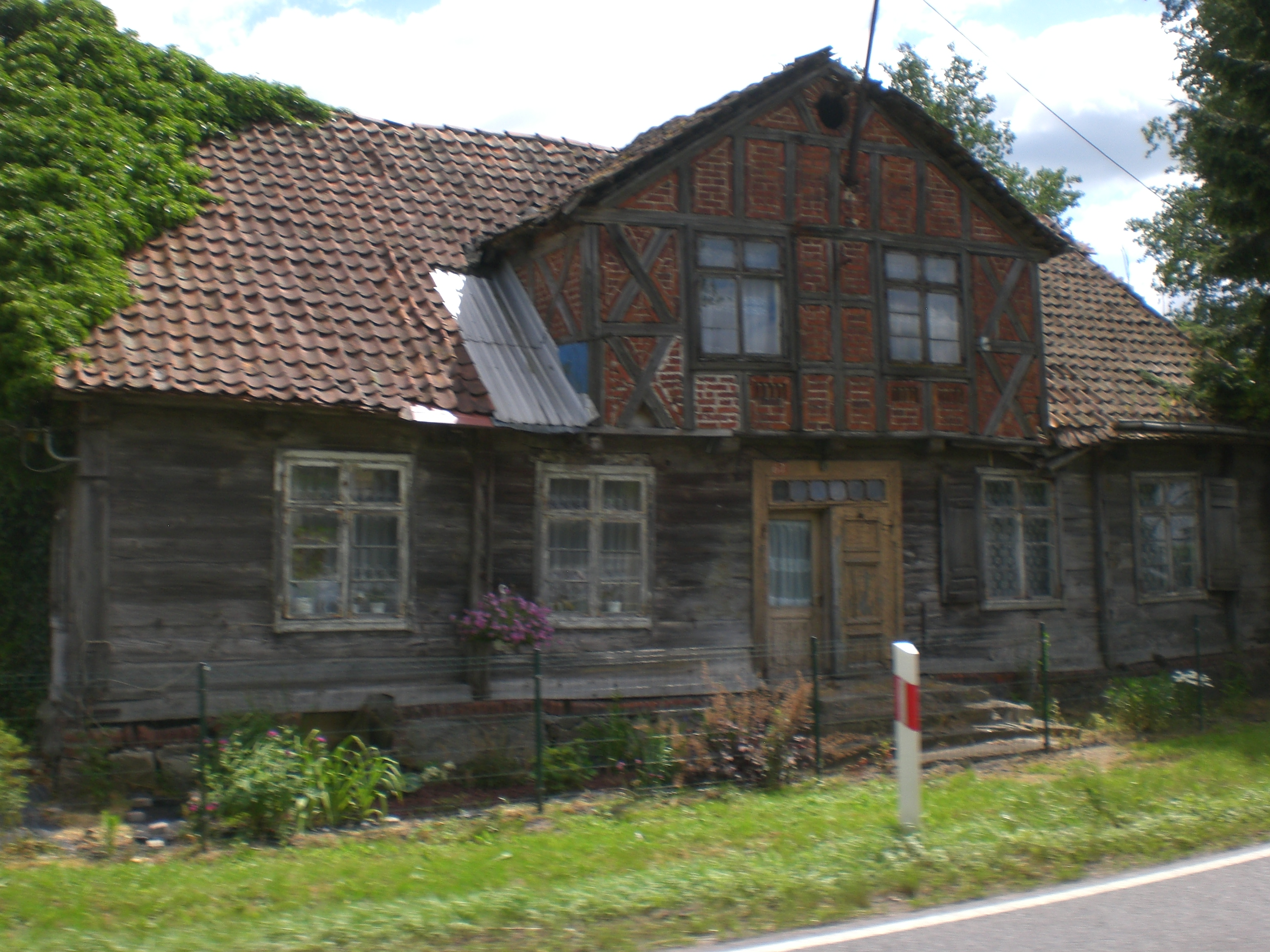
Nowy Dwór Elbląski

Nowy Dwór Elbląski [ˈnɔvɨ ˈdvur ɛlˈblɔ̃ski] is a village in the administrative district of Gmina Gronowo Elbląskie, within Elbląg County, Warmian-Masurian Voivodeship, in northern Poland.
