= Glinki, Greater Poland Voivodeship =

Glinki
- Settlement
- Location within Poland
- Coordinates: 52°18′57″N 16°43′57″E
- Country: Poland
- Voivodeship: Greater Poland
- County: Poznań
- Gmina: Dopiewo
- Population: 16

Glinki [ˈɡlinki] is a settlement in the administrative district of Gmina Dopiewo, within Poznań County, Greater Poland Voivodeship, in west-central Poland.
