= Dąbrówka, Poznań County =

Dąbrówka
- Village
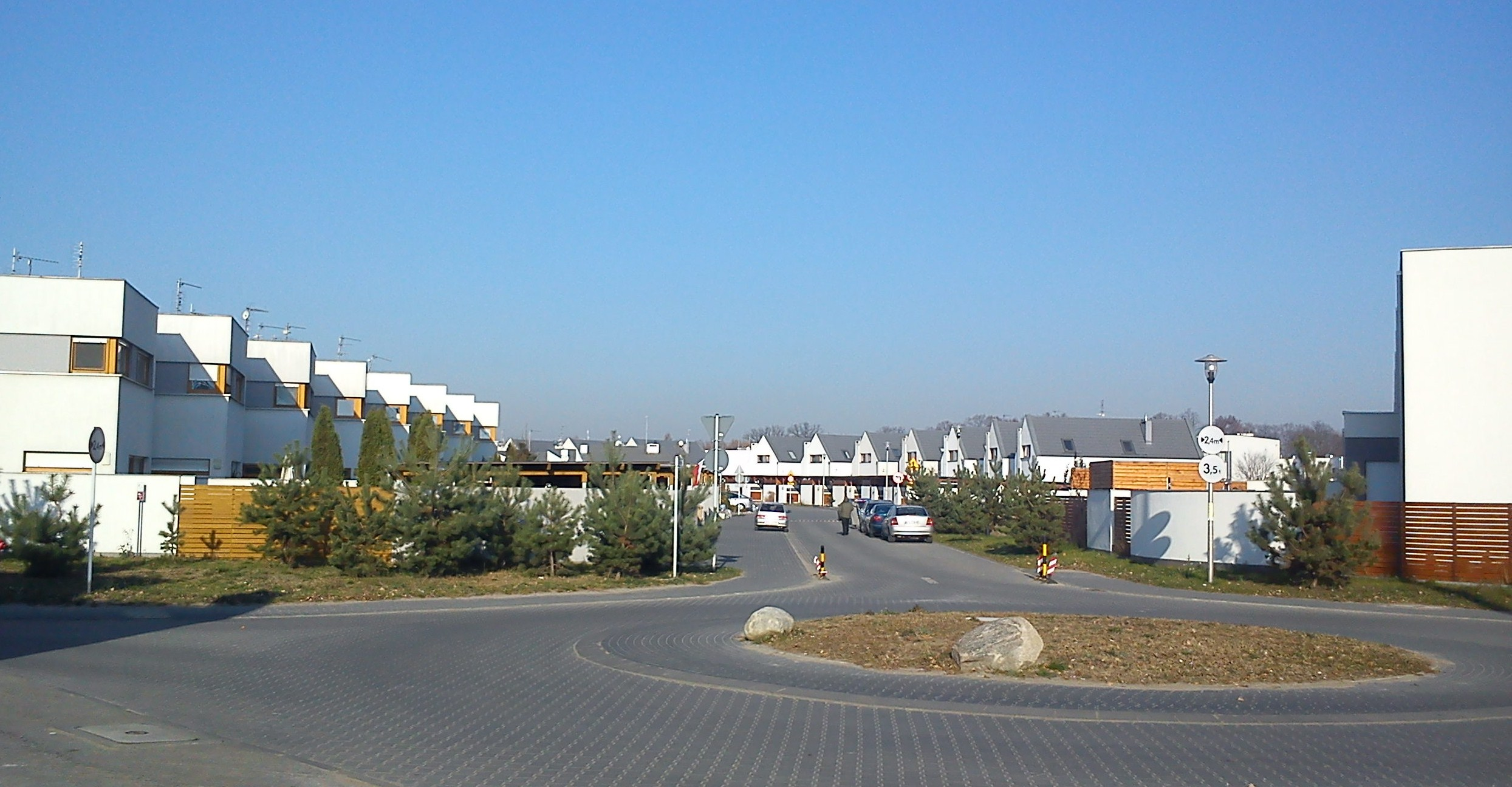

- Location within Poland
- Coordinates: 52°23′3″N 16°44′37″E
- Country: Poland
- Voivodeship: Greater Poland
- County: Poznań
- Gmina: Dopiewo

Population
  - Total: 4,344

Dąbrówka [dɔmˈbrufka] is a village in the administrative district of Gmina Dopiewo, within Poznań County, Greater Poland Voivodeship, in west-central Poland.
