= Różany, Warmian-Masurian Voivodeship =

Różany
- Village
- Location within Poland
- Coordinates: 54°4′2″N 19°19′15″E
- Country: Poland
- Voivodeship: Warmian-Masurian
- County: Elbląg
- Gmina: Gronowo Elbląskie
- Population: 130

Różany [ruˈʐanɨ] is a village in the administrative district of Gmina Gronowo Elbląskie, within Elbląg County, Warmian-Masurian Voivodeship, in northern Poland.
