= Wiktorowo, Warmian-Masurian Voivodeship =

Wiktorowo
- Village
- Location within Poland
- Coordinates: 54°8′57″N 19°17′55″E
- Country: Poland
- Voivodeship: Warmian-Masurian
- County: Elbląg
- Gmina: Gronowo Elbląskie
- Population: 150

Wiktorowo [viktɔˈrɔvɔ] is a village in the administrative district of Gmina Gronowo Elbląskie, within Elbląg County, Warmian-Masurian Voivodeship, in northern Poland.
