= Gmina Dopiewo =

Gmina Dopiewo Dopiewo Commune
- Gmina
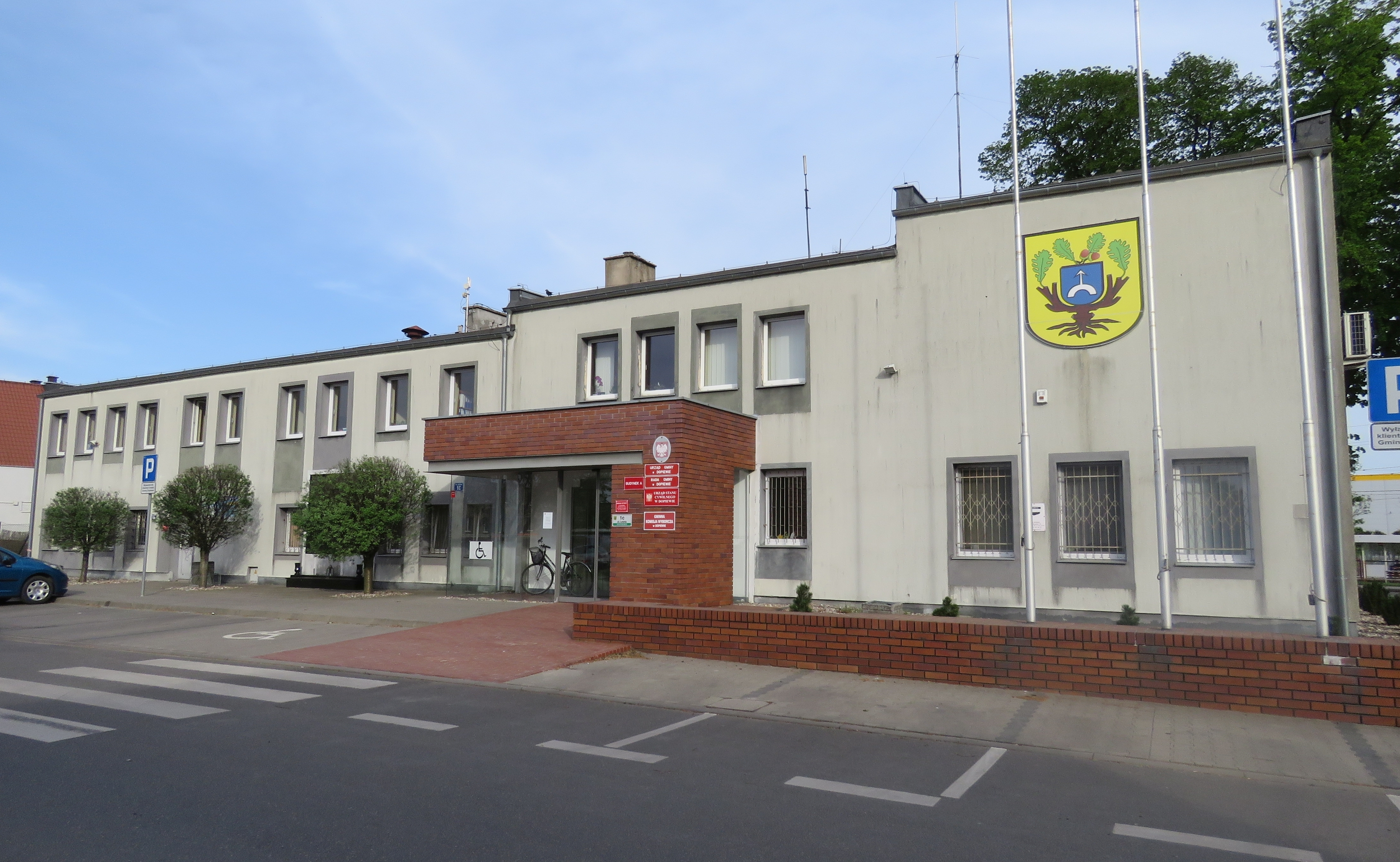

- Coat of arms
- Interactive map of Gmina Dopiewo
- Coordinates (Dopiewo): 52°22′N 16°41′E
- Country: Poland
- Voivodeship: Greater Poland
- County: Poznań County
- Seat: Dopiewo

Area
  - Total: 108.1 km^{2} (41.7 sq mi)

Population (31 December 2016)
  - Total: 23 961
  - Density: 0.21/km^{2} (0.55/sq mi)
- Website: http://www.dopiewo.pl/

Gmina Dopiewo is a rural gmina (administrative district) in Poznań County, Greater Poland Voivodeship, in west-central Poland. Its seat is the village of Dopiewo, which lies approximately 17 kilometres (11 mi) west of the regional capital Poznań.

The gmina covers an area of 108.1 square kilometres (41.7 sq mi), and as of 2012 its total population is 19,305.

== Villages ==
Gmina Dopiewo contains the villages and settlements of Dąbrowa, Dąbrówka, Dopiewiec, Dopiewo, Drwęca, Fiałkowo, Glinki, Gołuski, Joanka, Konarzewo, Lisówki, Palędzie, Podłoziny, Pokrzywnica, Skórzewo, Trzcielin, Więckowice, Zakrzewo, Żarnowiec and Zborowo.

== Neighbouring gminas ==
Gmina Dopiewo is bordered by the gminas of Buk, Komorniki, Stęszew and Tarnowo Podgórne.
