= Błotnica, Warmian-Masurian Voivodeship =

Błotnica
- Village
- Location within Poland
- Coordinates: 54°5′35″N 19°15′27″E
- Country: Poland
- Voivodeship: Warmian-Masurian
- County: Elbląg
- Gmina: Gronowo Elbląskie
- Population: 80

Błotnica [bwɔtˈnit͡sa] is a village in the administrative district of Gmina Gronowo Elbląskie, within Elbląg County, Warmian-Masurian Voivodeship, in northern Poland.
