= Szopy, Warmian–Masurian Voivodeship =

Szopy
- Village
- Location within Poland
- Coordinates: 54°6′51″N 19°19′52″E
- Country: Poland
- Voivodeship: Warmian-Masurian
- County: Elbląg
- Gmina: Gronowo Elbląskie
- Population: 60

Szopy [ˈʂɔpɨ] is a village in the administrative district of Gmina Gronowo Elbląskie, within Elbląg County, Warmian-Masurian Voivodeship, in northern Poland.
