= Glinki, Ełk County =

Glinki
- Village
- Location within Poland
- Coordinates: 53°41′41″N 22°20′13″E
- Country: Poland
- Voivodeship: Warmian-Masurian
- County: Ełk
- Gmina: Prostki
- Postal code: 19-326

Glinki [ˈɡlinki] is a village in the administrative district of Gmina Prostki, within Ełk County, Warmian-Masurian Voivodeship, in northern Poland.
