= Nogat, Warmian-Masurian Voivodeship =

Nogat
- Village
- Location within Poland
- Coordinates: 54°7′13″N 19°16′20″E
- Country: Poland
- Voivodeship: Warmian-Masurian
- County: Elbląg
- Gmina: Gronowo Elbląskie
- Founded: 1602
- Population: 160
- Time zone: UTC+1 (CET)
  - Summer (DST): UTC+2 (CEST)
- Vehicle registration: NEB

Nogat [ˈnɔɡat] is a village in the administrative district of Gmina Gronowo Elbląskie, within Elbląg County, Warmian-Masurian Voivodeship, in northern Poland.
