= Dakowy Mokre =

- Village
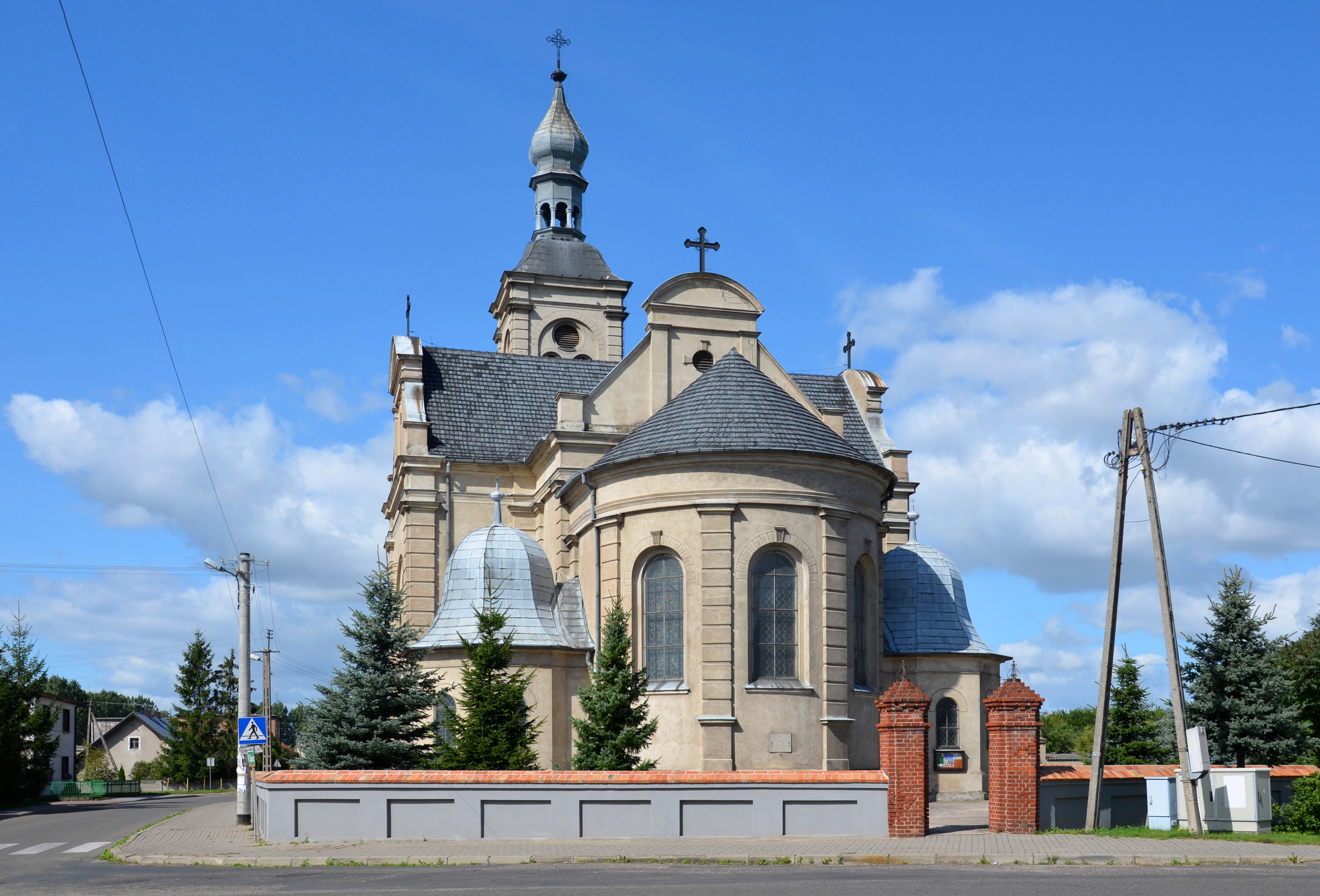

- Location within Poland
- Coordinates: 52°16′N 16°30′E
- Country: Poland
- Voivodeship: Greater Poland
- County: Nowy Tomyśl
- Gmina: Opalenica
- Population: 509

Dakowy Mokre [daˈkɔvɨ ˈmɔkrɛ] is a village in the administrative district of Gmina Opalenica, within Nowy Tomyśl County, Greater Poland Voivodeship, in west-central Poland.

== Notable people ==
- Jan Sokolowski (1899-1982), ornithologist
