= Gronowo Elbląskie =

- Village
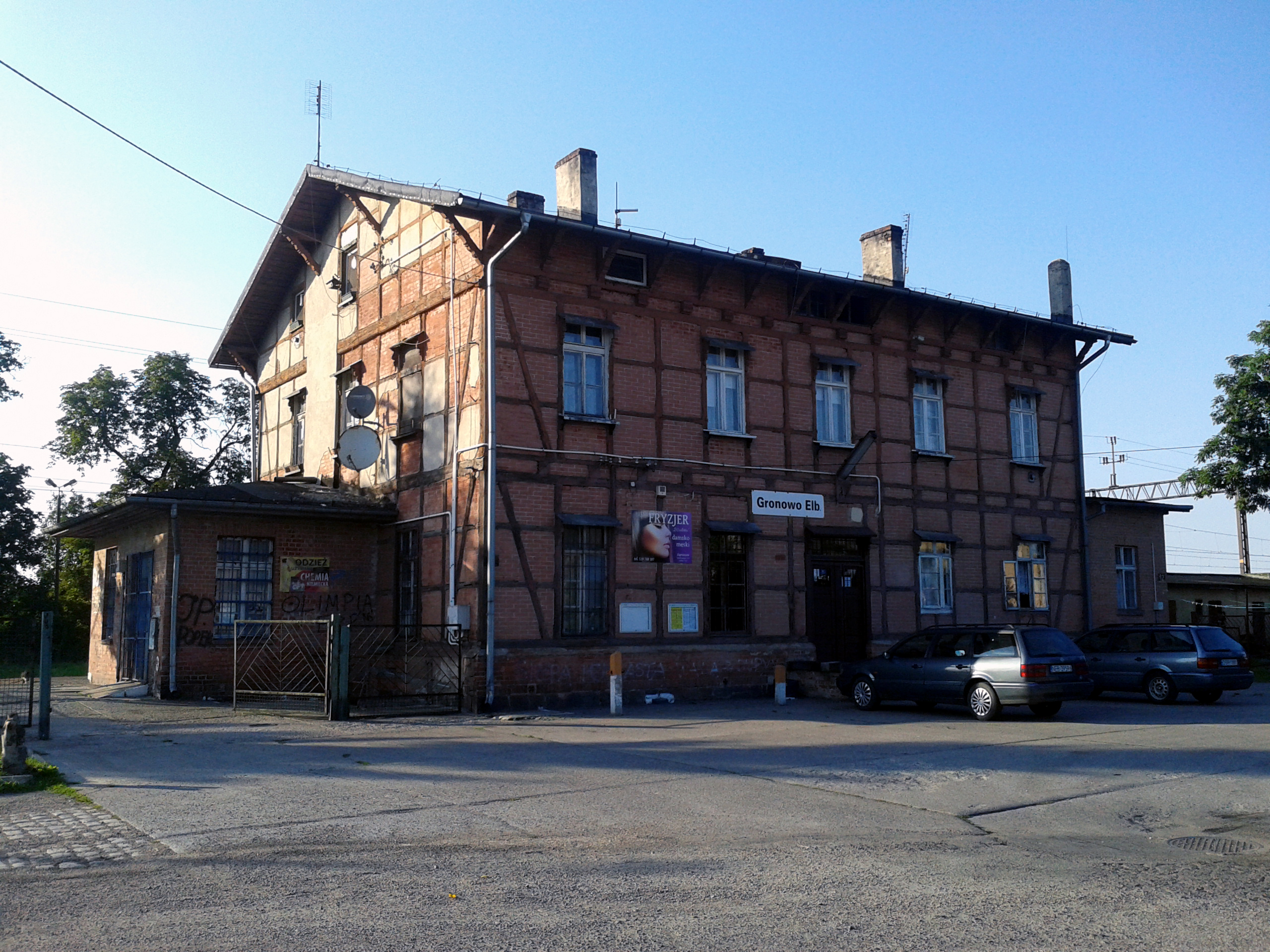
- Gronowo Elbląskie train station

- Location within Poland
- Coordinates: 54°5′6″N 19°18′26″E
- Country: Poland
- Voivodeship: Warmian-Masurian
- County: Elbląg
- Gmina: Gronowo Elbląskie

Population
  - Total: 1,600
- Time zone: UTC+1 (CET)
  - Summer (DST): UTC+2 (CEST)
- Vehicle registration: NEB

Gronowo Elbląskie [ɡrɔˈnɔvɔ ɛlˈblɔ̃skʲɛ] (German: Grunau) is a village in Elbląg County, Warmian-Masurian Voivodeship, in northern Poland. It is the seat of the gmina (administrative district) called Gmina Gronowo Elbląskie.

== History ==
Human settlement dates back to ancient times. Ancient Roman coins from the time of Emperors Theodosius II, Valentinian III, Leo I and Libius Severus have been discovered in the village. The oldest known location privilege of the village dates back to 1365. In 1410, Polish King Władysław II Jagiełło granted the village to the New Town of Elbląg as a reward for its support against the Teutonic Knights in the Polish–Lithuanian–Teutonic War. During the Thirteen Years' War, in 1457, King Casimir IV Jagiellon granted the village to the Old Town of Elbląg, which led to a long dispute between the Old and New Towns over the village, however, it effectively remained under the administration of the Old Town. According to account books from 1533, grapes were grown on the hill adjacent to the village. No later than 1609, a paper mill was established in the village.

== Transport ==
There is a train station in the village.

== Sports ==
The local football team is Pomowiec Gronowo Elbląskie. It competes in the lower leagues.

== Notable people ==
- Bronisław Korko (1917–1968), Polish soldier who fought in the Battle of Westerplatte against the German invasion in 1939
