= Poznań County =

Poznań County Powiat poznański
- County
- Flag Coat of arms

- Location within the voivodeship
- Coordinates (Poznań): 52°24′N 16°55′E
- Country: Poland
- Voivodeship: Greater Poland
- Administrative Seat: Poznań
- Gminas: Total 17 (incl. 2 urban): Luboń; Puszczykowo; Gmina Buk; Gmina Czerwonak; Gmina Dopiewo; Gmina Kleszczewo; Gmina Komorniki; Gmina Kórnik; Gmina Kostrzyn; Gmina Mosina; Gmina Murowana Goślina; Gmina Pobiedziska; Gmina Rokietnica; Gmina Stęszew; Gmina Suchy Las; Gmina Swarzędz; Gmina Tarnowo Podgórne

Area
  - Total: 1,899.61 km^{2} (733.44 sq mi)

Population (2020)
  - Total: 403,417
  - Density: 212.368/km^{2} (550.031/sq mi)
  - Urban: 135,360
  - Rural: 268,057
- Car plates: POZ, PZ
- Website: powiat.poznan.pl

Poznań County (Polish: powiat poznański) is a unit of territorial administration and local government (powiat) in Greater Poland Voivodeship, west-central Poland. It came into being on January 1, 1999, as a result of the Polish local government reforms passed in 1998. Its administrative seat is the city of Poznań, although the city is not part of the county (it constitutes a separate city county). The county's administrative offices (starostwo powiatowe) are in the Jeżyce neighbourhood of Poznań.

== Composition, Area and Population ==
Poznań County contains 10 towns: Swarzędz, 11 km (7 mi) east of (central) Poznań, Luboń, 8 km (5 mi) south of Poznań, Mosina, 18 km (11 mi) south of Poznań, Murowana Goślina, 20 km (12 mi) north of Poznań, Puszczykowo, 14 km (9 mi) south of Poznań, Kostrzyn, 21 km (13 mi) east of Poznań, Pobiedziska, 27 km (17 mi) north-east of Poznań, Kórnik, 22 km (14 mi) south-east of Poznań, Buk, 28 km (17 mi) west of Poznań, and Stęszew, 21 km (13 mi) south-west of Poznań.

The county covers an area of 1,899.61 square kilometres (733.4 sq mi). As of 2012 its total population is 341.357, out of which the urban population is 132,048 (Swarzędz 29,894, Luboń 26,935, Mosina 12,150, Murowana Goślina 10,140, Puszczykowo 9,311, Kostrzyn 8,539, Pobiedziska 8,329, Kórnik 6,981, Buk 6,181, Stęszew 5,339), and the rural population is 209,309.

== Neighbouring counties ==
Apart from the city of Poznań, Poznań County is also bordered by Oborniki County and Wągrowiec County to the north, Gniezno County and Września County to the east, Środa County to the south-east, Śrem County and Kościan County to the south, Grodzisk County and Nowy Tomyśl County to the west, and Szamotuły County to the north-west.

== Administrative divisions ==
The county is subdivided into 17 gminas (two urban, eight urban-rural and seven rural). These are listed in the following table, in descending order of population.

Gmina	Type	Area (km^{2})	Population (2006)	Seat
Gmina Swarzędz	urban-rural	102.0	40,499	Swarzędz
Luboń	urban	13.5	26,935	
Gmina Mosina	urban-rural	170.9	25,098	Mosina
Gmina Czerwonak	rural	91.4	23,692	Czerwonak
Gmina Tarnowo Podgórne	rural	101.4	18,690	Tarnowo Podgórne
Gmina Kórnik	urban-rural	186.6	17,585	Kórnik
Gmina Pobiedziska	urban-rural	189.3	16,382	Pobiedziska
Gmina Murowana Goślina	urban-rural	162.9	15,766	Murowana Goślina
Gmina Kostrzyn	urban-rural	154.0	15,456	Kostrzyn
Gmina Komorniki	rural	66.6	14,353	Komorniki
Gmina Stęszew	urban-rural	175.2	13,919	Stęszew
Gmina Dopiewo	rural	108.1	13,889	Dopiewo
Gmina Suchy Las	rural	116.6	13,219	Suchy Las
Gmina Buk	urban-rural	90.3	11,917	Buk
Gmina Rokietnica	rural	79.3	9,415	Rokietnica
Puszczykowo	urban	16.7	9,311	
Gmina Kleszczewo	rural	74.8	5,436	Kleszczewo

== Demographics ==
Historical population
Year	Pop.	±%
1995	240,708	—
1998	248,672	+3.3%
2001	264,855	+6.5%
2004	280,924	+6.1%
2007	303,595	+8.1%
2010	327,110	+7.7%
2013	352,395	+7.7%
2015	366,097	+3.9%
2016	373,570	+2.0%
2017	381,630	+2.2%
2020	403,417	+5.7%
Note: 2010 2014 2017 2020

== Map ==
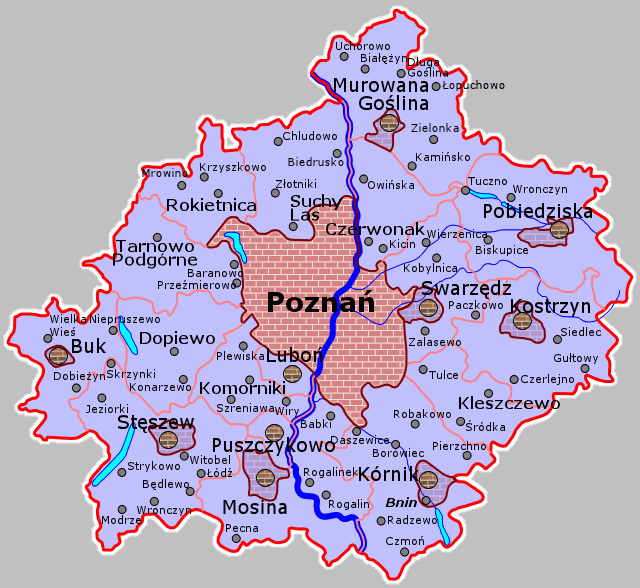
A map of Poznań County. The pink lines indicate the boundaries of towns and gminas.

== Finances ==
At the 5th European Congress of Councils in Kraków in 2019, the county was nationally awarded as best financially prudent among urban councils. A year later they came second.

In announcing 2021 budget they foresaw an annual income of 408,379,127.79zł and an expenditure of 446,379,127.79zł, leaving a deficit of 38,000,000.00zł which will be covered through its credit.
