= Janov =

Janov may refer to:

== Places ==
=== Czech Republic ===
- Janov (Bruntál District), a town in the Moravian-Silesian Region
- Janov (Děčín District), a municipality and village in the Ústí nad Labem Region
- Janov (Rakovník District), a municipality and village in the Central Bohemian Region
- Janov (Rychnov nad Kněžnou District), a municipality and village in the Hradec Králové Region
- Janov (Svitavy District), a municipality and village in the Pardubice Region
- Janov nad Nisou, a municipality and village in the Liberec Region
- Janov, a village and part of Kočov in the Plzeň Region
- Janov, a village and part of Kosova Hora in the Central Bohemian Region
- Janov, a town part of Litvínov in the Ústí nad Labem Region
- Janov, a village and part of Mladá Vožice in the South Bohemian Region
- Janov, a village and part of Nový Bor in the Liberec Region
- Janov, a village and part of Roudná in the South Bohemian Region
- Janov, a village and part of Staré Hobzí in the South Bohemian Region

=== Italy ===
- Janov, Czech and Slovak exonym for Genoa

=== Slovakia ===
- Janov, Prešov District, a municipality and village in the Prešov Region

== People ==
- Arthur Janov, American psychologist
  - Janov's warnings named after him
- Matthias of Janov, Bohemian ecclesiastical writer

=== Fictional ===
- Janov Pelorat, a character in the Foundation Series of books by Isaac Asimov

== See also ==
- Janów (disambiguation)
- Yaniv (disambiguation)
