= Janów =

Janów may refer to:

- Janów, Chełm County in Lublin Voivodeship (east Poland)
- Janów, Lublin County in Lublin Voivodeship (east Poland)
- Janów, Podlaskie Voivodeship (north-east Poland)
- Janów, Gmina Bełchatów in Łódź Voivodeship (central Poland)
- Janów, Gmina Zelów in Łódź Voivodeship (central Poland)
- Janów, Brzeziny County in Łódź Voivodeship (central Poland)
- Janów, Gmina Bedlno in Łódź Voivodeship (central Poland)
- Janów, Gmina Oporów in Łódź Voivodeship (central Poland)
- Janów, Gmina Góra Świętej Małgorzaty in Łódź Voivodeship (central Poland)
- Janów, Łódź East County in Łódź Voivodeship (central Poland)
- Janów, Pajęczno County in Łódź Voivodeship (central Poland)
- Janów, Gmina Łęki Szlacheckie in Łódź Voivodeship (central Poland)
- Janów, Gmina Wolbórz in Łódź Voivodeship (central Poland)
- Janów, Rawa County in Łódź Voivodeship (central Poland)
- Janów, Skierniewice County in Łódź Voivodeship (central Poland)
- Janów, Gmina Żelechlinek, Tomaszów County in Łódź Voivodeship (central Poland)
- Janów, Wieluń County in Łódź Voivodeship (central Poland)
- Janów, Gmina Parzęczew in Łódź Voivodeship (central Poland)
- Janów, Gmina Zgierz in Łódź Voivodeship (central Poland)
- Janów, Puławy County in Lublin Voivodeship (east Poland)
- Janów, Kielce County in Świętokrzyskie Voivodeship (south-central Poland)
- Janów, Końskie County in Świętokrzyskie Voivodeship (south-central Poland)
- Janów, Gmina Ożarów in Świętokrzyskie Voivodeship (south-central Poland)
- Janów, Gmina Tarłów in Świętokrzyskie Voivodeship (south-central Poland)
- Janów, Pińczów County in Świętokrzyskie Voivodeship (south-central Poland)
- Janów, Grójec County in Masovian Voivodeship (east-central Poland)
- Janów, Kozienice County in Masovian Voivodeship (east-central Poland)
- Janów, Lipsko County in Masovian Voivodeship (east-central Poland)
- Janów, Mińsk County in Masovian Voivodeship (east-central Poland)
- Janów, Otwock County in Masovian Voivodeship (east-central Poland)
- Janów, Przysucha County in Masovian Voivodeship (east-central Poland)
- Janów, Radom County in Masovian Voivodeship (east-central Poland)
- Janów, Gmina Brochów in Masovian Voivodeship (east-central Poland)
- Janów, Gmina Młodzieszyn in Masovian Voivodeship (east-central Poland)
- Janów, Warsaw West County in Masovian Voivodeship (east-central Poland)
- Janów, Zwoleń County in Masovian Voivodeship (east-central Poland)
- Janów, Konin County in Greater Poland Voivodeship (west-central Poland)
- Janów, Krotoszyn County in Greater Poland Voivodeship (west-central Poland)
- Janów, Turek County in Greater Poland Voivodeship (west-central Poland)
- Janów, Silesian Voivodeship (south Poland)
- Janów, Opole Voivodeship (southwest Poland)
- Janów, Warmian-Masurian Voivodeship (north Poland)

== See also ==
- Janow, a village in Neuendorf B, Germany
- Ivano-Frankove (Polish name Janów), Ukraine
- Janów Karwicki, a village in the Łódź Voivodeship, central Poland
- Janów Lubelski, a town in the Lublin Voivodeship, east Poland
- Janów-Mikołajówka, a village in the Masovian Voivodeship, east-central Poland
- Janów-Nikiszowiec, a district of Katowice, a city in Poland
- Janów Podlaski, a village in the Lublin Voivodeship, east Poland
- Janów Podlaski Stud Farm, state stud farm which breeds Arabian horses
- Janów Poleski, the Polish name for Ivanava, a town in Belarus
- Janov (disambiguation)
- Janowo (disambiguation)
