= Yaniv (name) =

- Gender: Male
- Language: Hebrew language

Origin
- Meaning: He will prosper

Yaniv (Hebrew: יָניב) is a Hebrew male name meaning "he will prosper".

== People with the given name ==
- Yaniv Abargil (born 1977), Israeli footballer
- Yaniv Altshuler (born 1978), Israeli computer scientist
- Yaniv Asor (born 1972), Israeli military commander
- Yaniv Azran (born 1983), Israeli footballer
- Yaniv Ben-Nissan (born 1983), Israeli footballer
- Yaniv Biton (born 1978), Israeli actor
- Yaniv Brik (born 1995), Israeli footballer
- Yaniv Chichian (born 1979), Israeli footballer
- Yaniv d'Or (born 1975), Israeli-British singer
- Yaniv Edery (born 2003), French-Moroccan footballer
- Yaniv Erlich, Israeli-American scientist
- Yaniv Green (born 1980), Israeli basketball player
- Yaniv Iczkovits (born 1975), Israeli writer
- Yaniv Katan (born 1981), Israeli footballer
- Yaniv Lavi, Israeli footballer
- Yaniv Perets (born 2000), Canadian ice hockey player
- Yaniv Rokah, Israeli-American actor
- Yaniv Schulman or Nev Schulman (born 1984), American TV host
- Yaniv Segev (born 1996), Israeli footballer
- Yaniv Zohar, Israeli journalist

== People with the surname ==
- Daniela Yaniv-Richter (born 1956), Israeli artist
- Idan Yaniv (born 1986), Israeli singer
- Jessica Yaniv, Canadian transgender rights activist
- Karina Yaniv, Israeli scientist
- Moshé Yaniv (born 1938), French-Israeli scientist
- Nir Yaniv, Israeli artist
- Shmuel Yaniv, Israeli researcher
- Volodymyr Yaniv (1908–1991), Ukrainian national activist and academic
- Zohara Yaniv (born 1937), Israeli scientist
