= Cieplice =

Cieplice may refer to the following places in Poland:

- Cieplice, Lesser Poland Voivodeship (south Poland)
- Cieplice, Subcarpathian Voivodeship (south-east Poland)
- Cieplice, Warmian-Masurian Voivodeship (north Poland)
- Cieplice Śląskie-Zdrój, a former town, now a district of Jelenia Góra
