= Novakovo =

Novakovo may refer to:

- Novakovo, Varna Province, Bulgaria
- Novakovo, Plovdiv Province, Bulgaria
- Novakovo, Odesa Oblast, Ukraine

== See also ==
- Nowakowo
