= Dłużyna =

Dłużyna may refer to the following places:

- Dłużyna, Greater Poland Voivodeship (west-central Poland)
- Dłużyna, Warmian-Masurian Voivodeship (north Poland)
- Dłużyna, West Pomeranian Voivodeship (north-west Poland)
