= Sierpiński (surname) =

Sierpiński, feminine: Sierpińska is a Polish-language toponymic surname derived from the placename Sierpin. Notable people with the surname include:

- Anna Sierpińska, Polish-Canadian scholar of mathematics education
- Wacław Sierpiński, Polish mathematician
- Zdzisław Sierpiński (1924–2004), Polish journalist and music critic, soldier of the Home Army, participant of the Warsaw Uprising
