= Janowo =

Janowo may refer to the following places in Poland:

- Janowo, Lower Silesian Voivodeship (south-west Poland)
- Janowo, Aleksandrów County in Kuyavian-Pomeranian Voivodeship (north-central Poland)
- Janowo, Brodnica County in Kuyavian-Pomeranian Voivodeship (north-central Poland)
- Janowo, Bydgoszcz County in Kuyavian-Pomeranian Voivodeship (north-central Poland)
- Janowo, Lipno County in Kuyavian-Pomeranian Voivodeship (north-central Poland)
- Janowo, Nakło County in Kuyavian-Pomeranian Voivodeship (north-central Poland)
- Janowo, Gmina Boniewo in Kuyavian-Pomeranian Voivodeship (north-central Poland)
- Janowo, Gmina Choceń in Kuyavian-Pomeranian Voivodeship (north-central Poland)
- Janowo, Grajewo County in Podlaskie Voivodeship (north-east Poland)
- Janowo, Gmina Narew in Podlaskie Voivodeship (north-east Poland)
- Janowo, Gmina Narewka in Podlaskie Voivodeship (north-east Poland)
- Janowo, Kolno County in Podlaskie Voivodeship (north-east Poland)
- Janowo, Łomża County in Podlaskie Voivodeship (north-east Poland)
- Janowo, Ciechanów County in Masovian Voivodeship (east-central Poland)
- Janowo, Gmina Zakroczym, Nowy Dwór County in Masovian Voivodeship (east-central Poland)
- Janowo, Gmina Andrzejewo, Ostrów County in Masovian Voivodeship (east-central Poland)
- Janowo, Węgrów County in Masovian Voivodeship (east-central Poland)
- Janowo, Wyszków County in Masovian Voivodeship (east-central Poland)
- Janowo, Konin County in Greater Poland Voivodeship (west-central Poland)
- Janowo, Rawicz County in Greater Poland Voivodeship (west-central Poland)
- Janowo, Słupca County in Greater Poland Voivodeship (west-central Poland)
- Janowo, Gmina Środa Wielkopolska in Greater Poland Voivodeship (west-central Poland)
- Janowo, Gmina Dominowo in Greater Poland Voivodeship (west-central Poland)
- Janowo, Lubusz Voivodeship (west Poland)
- Janowo, Bytów County in Pomeranian Voivodeship (north Poland)
- Janowo, Kartuzy County in Pomeranian Voivodeship (north Poland)
- Janowo, Kwidzyn County in Pomeranian Voivodeship (north Poland)
- Janowo, Malbork County in Pomeranian Voivodeship (north Poland)
- Janowo, Starogard County in Pomeranian Voivodeship (north Poland)
- Janowo, Tczew County in Pomeranian Voivodeship (north Poland)
- Janowo, Działdowo County in Warmian-Masurian Voivodeship (north Poland)
- Janowo, Elbląg County in Warmian-Masurian Voivodeship (north Poland)
- Janowo, Gołdap County in Warmian-Masurian Voivodeship (north Poland)
- Janowo, Iława County in Warmian-Masurian Voivodeship (north Poland)
- Janowo, Mrągowo County in Warmian-Masurian Voivodeship (north Poland)
- Janowo, Nidzica County in Warmian-Masurian Voivodeship (north Poland)
- Janowo, Ostróda County in Warmian-Masurian Voivodeship (north Poland)
- Janowo, Gryfice County in West Pomeranian Voivodeship (north-west Poland)
- Janowo, Myślibórz County in West Pomeranian Voivodeship (north-west Poland)
- Janowo, Pyrzyce County in West Pomeranian Voivodeship (north-west Poland)
- Janowo, Szczecinek County in West Pomeranian Voivodeship (north-west Poland)
- Gmina Janowo, Nidzica County, Warmian-Masurian Voivodeship, in northern Poland
