= Klepa =

Klepa may refer to:

- Klepa, Poland, a village in Poland
- Klepa, Greece, a village in the municipality Platanos, Aetolia-Acarnania, Greece
- Klepa, a fictional character, main personage of children's Klepa magazine, books and cartoons, created by Natalia Dubinina
