= Ujście (disambiguation) =

Ujście is a town in Greater Poland Voivodeship, west-central Poland.

Ujście (which means "(river) mouth" or "confluence" in Polish) may also refer to the following places:

- Ujście, Lublin Voivodeship (east Poland)
- Ujście, Braniewo County in Warmian-Masurian Voivodeship (north Poland)
- Ujście, Elbląg County in Warmian-Masurian Voivodeship (north Poland)

== See also ==
- Ujście Warty National Park, a protected area near the confluence of the Warta and Oder
- Ujście Warty Landscape Park, a similar but wider-ranging area
