= Yaniv =

Yaniv (Hebrew: יָניב) is a Hebrew male name meaning "he will prosper". It may also refer to:

- Yaniv (card game), an Israeli card game with no established rules

== Places ==
- Yaniv (village), south of Pripyat, Kyiv Oblast, Ukraine
- Yaniv, Ukraine, former name of Ivano-Frankove, Lviv Oblast, Ukraine
- Yaniv, former name of Dolyna, Ternopil Raion, Ternopil Oblast

== People ==
- Yaniv (name), a given name and family name
  - Yaniv Green (born 1980), Israeli basketball player
  - Yaniv Katan (born 1981), Israeli footballer
  - Yaniv Perets (born 2000), Canadian ice hockey player
  - Yaniv Schulman or Nev Schulman (born 1984), American TV host
  - Idan Yaniv (born 1986), Israeli singer
  - Yaniv Zohar, Israeli journalist

== See also ==
- Janov (disambiguation)
