= Batorowo =

Batorowo may refer to:

- Batorowo, Poznań County in Greater Poland Voivodeship (west-central Poland)
- Batorowo, Złotów County in Greater Poland Voivodeship (west-central Poland)
- Batorowo, Warmian-Masurian Voivodeship (north Poland)
