= Adamowo, Elbląg County =

Adamowo
- Village
- Location within Poland
- Coordinates: 54°9′20″N 19°16′7″E
- Country: Poland
- Voivodeship: Warmian-Masurian
- County: Elbląg
- Gmina: Elbląg
- Population: 70

Adamowo [adaˈmɔvɔ] is a village in the administrative district of Gmina Elbląg, within Elbląg County, Warmian-Masurian Voivodeship, in northern Poland.
