= Zaścianek, Warmian-Masurian Voivodeship =

Zaścianek
- Settlement
- Location within Poland
- Coordinates: 54°11′21″N 19°19′9″E
- Country: Poland
- Voivodeship: Warmian-Masurian
- County: Elbląg
- Gmina: Elbląg

Zaścianek [zaɕˈt͡ɕanɛk] is a settlement in the administrative district of Gmina Elbląg, within Elbląg County, Warmian-Masurian Voivodeship, in northern Poland.
