= Kazimierzewo, Warmian-Masurian Voivodeship =

Kazimierzewo
- Village
- Location within Poland
- Coordinates: 54°10′0″N 19°20′13″E
- Country: Poland
- Voivodeship: Warmian-Masurian
- County: Elbląg
- Gmina: Elbląg
- Population: 290

Kazimierzewo [kaʑimjɛˈʐɛvɔ] is a village in the administrative district of Gmina Elbląg, within Elbląg County, Warmian-Masurian Voivodeship, in northern Poland.
