= Rybaki, Elbląg County =

Rybaki
- Settlement
- Location within Poland
- Coordinates: 54°5′26″N 19°31′44″E
- Country: Poland
- Voivodeship: Warmian-Masurian
- County: Elbląg
- Gmina: Elbląg

Rybaki [rɨˈbaki] is a settlement in the administrative district of Gmina Elbląg, within Elbląg County, Warmian-Masurian Voivodeship, in northern Poland.
