= Kępiny Wielkie =

- Village
- Location within Poland
- Coordinates: 54°13′55″N 19°18′42″E
- Country: Poland
- Voivodeship: Warmian-Masurian
- County: Elbląg
- Gmina: Elbląg
- Population: 120
- Time zone: UTC+1 (CET)
  - Summer (DST): UTC+2 (CEST)
- Vehicle registration: NEB

Kępiny Wielkie [kɛmˈpinɨ ˈvjɛlkʲɛ] is a village in the administrative district of Gmina Elbląg, within Elbląg County, Warmian-Masurian Voivodeship, in northern Poland.

== History ==
The village was part of the Kingdom of Poland until the First Partition of Poland in 1772, when it was annexed by Prussia. In 1871 it became part of Germany. During World War II, in 1939–1941, it was the location of a subcamp of the Stutthof concentration camp, in which the Germans imprisoned 200 people as forced labour at a time. Dead prisoners were constantly replaced by new ones sent from the Stutthof camp. Following Germany's defeat in World War II, in 1945, the village was reintegrated with Poland.
