= Helenowo, Warmian-Masurian Voivodeship =

Helenowo
- Village
- Location within Poland
- Coordinates: 54°8′58″N 19°21′24″E
- Country: Poland
- Voivodeship: Warmian-Masurian
- County: Elbląg
- Gmina: Elbląg
- Population: 140

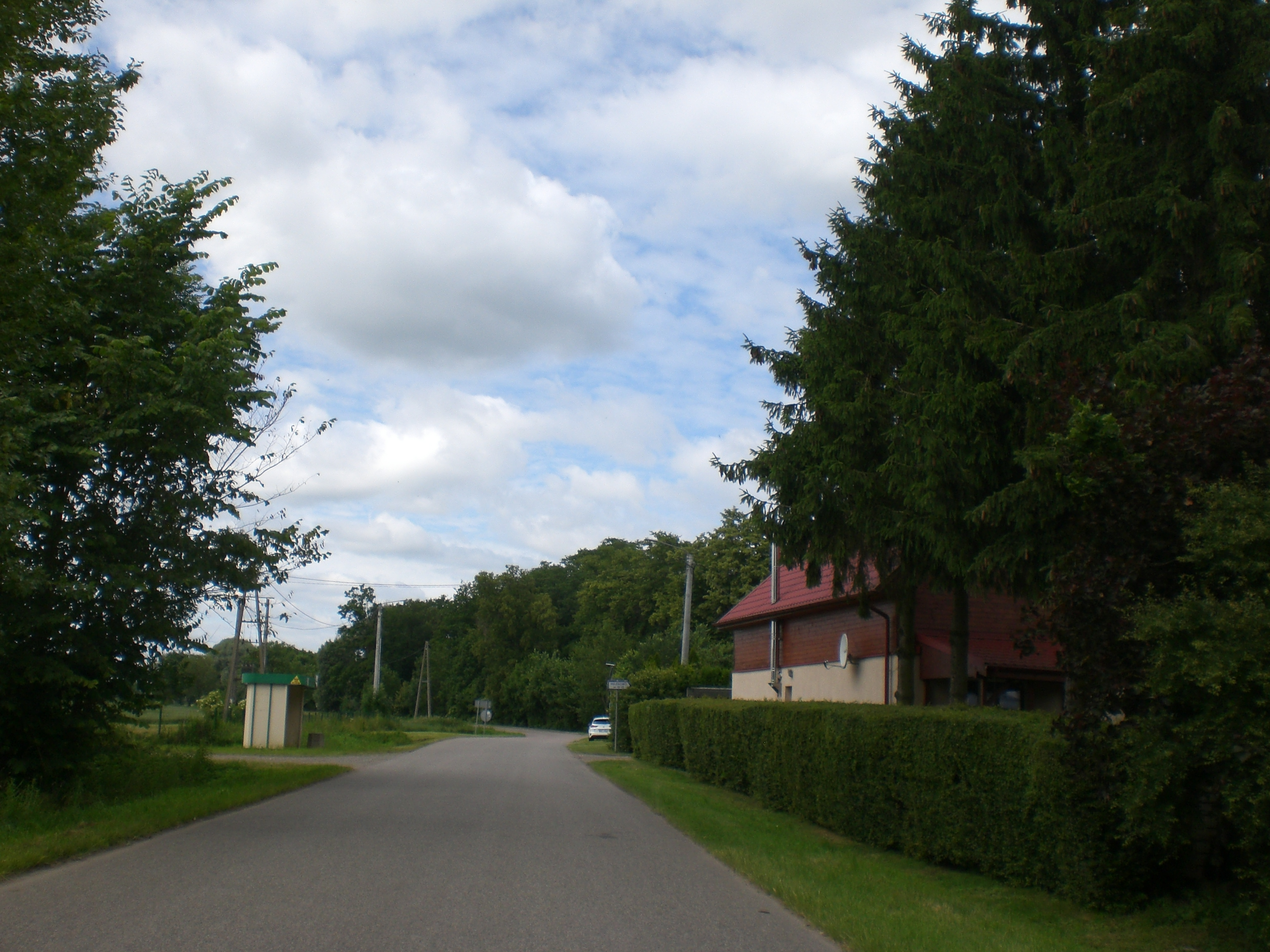
Helenowo

Helenowo [xɛlɛˈnɔvɔ] is a village in the administrative district of Gmina Elbląg, located within Elbląg County, Warmian-Masurian Voivodeship, in northern Poland.
