= Gronowo Górne-Osiedle =

- Village
- Location within Poland
- Coordinates: 54°8′19″N 19°27′35″E
- Country: Poland
- Voivodeship: Warmian-Masurian
- County: Elbląg
- Gmina: Elbląg

Gronowo Górne-Osiedle [ɡrɔˈnɔvɔ ˈɡurnɛ ɔˈɕɛdlɛ] is a village in the administrative district of Gmina Elbląg, within Elbląg County, Warmian-Masurian Voivodeship, in northern Poland.
