= Pasieki, Warmian-Masurian Voivodeship =

Pasieki
- Village
- Location within Poland
- Coordinates: 54°6′48″N 19°33′32″E
- Country: Poland
- Voivodeship: Warmian-Masurian
- County: Elbląg
- Gmina: Elbląg
- Population: 30

Pasieki [paˈɕɛki] is a village in the administrative district of Gmina Elbląg, within Elbląg County, Warmian-Masurian Voivodeship, in northern Poland.
