= Uriel Bachrach =

German-born Israeli molecular biologist and professor (born 1926)

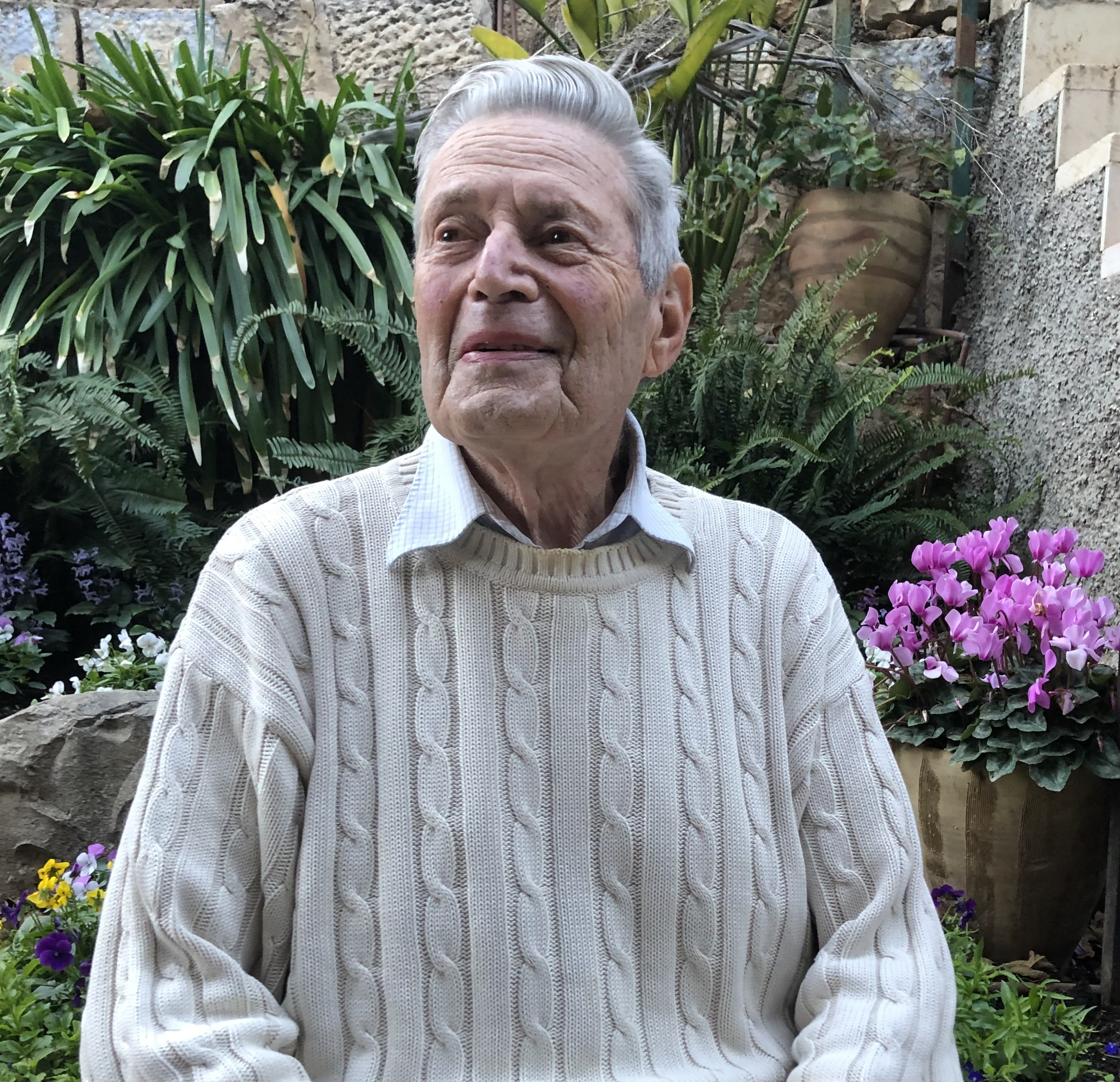
Bachrach in 2021

Uriel Bachrach (Hebrew: אוריאל בכרך; born 9 September 1926) is a German-born Israeli molecular biologist and professor at the Hebrew University of Jerusalem. He is best known for his work on the physiology and function of naturally occurring polyamines. He was also a founding member of Hemed, the Israeli Science Corps, which developed munitions and weapons for the State of Israel prior to its founding as a state in 1948.

== Biography ==
Uriel Bachrach was born in Heilbronn, Germany, in 1926 and immigrated to Palestine in 1933 at the age of six. In 1945 he began studying chemistry at the Hebrew University of Jerusalem.

In 1947, David Ben-Gurion directed a group of twenty physics and chemistry scientists, including Uriel Bachrach, to form HEMED, the Israeli Science Corps, under the direction of Ephraim Katzir. HEMED was the nascent defense industry for the State of Israel.

In 1949, Bachrach earned a master's degree in biochemistry, and in 1950 he earned a master's degree in microbiology. He was awarded a Ph.D., degree in 1953. Bachrach joined the faculty of medicine at the Hebrew University, and in 1971 was appointed a full professor and chairman of the department of molecular biology. He has been a visiting professor at various American and European universities.

In 2009, Bachrach published a Hebrew-language book about the founding of HEMED. In 2016, he published an English-language version of his book about the creation of the Israeli Science Corps, The Power of Knowledge - HEMED: The Israeli Science Corps.

== Honors and awards ==
In 1995, Bachrach was awarded an honorary doctorate by the University of Bologna in Italy.

In 2009, Bachrach received a special prize from the State of Israel given by President Shimon Peres for his contributions to Israel for his work in HEMED.

In 2010, Bachrach received a special award from the Mayor of Rome for significant contributions to cancer research. He was one of the organizers of the 11th International Conference on Polyamine, Cancer and Other Diseases, in Tivoli, Lazio, Italy.

== Research ==
Bachrach has conducted extensive research in the field of polyamines and studied various aspects of their development. Bachrach continues to lecture in various forums about this unique chapter in Israel’s history. He has also published numerous articles on molecular biology, chemistry, and cancer research.

== Personal life ==
Bachrach is married to Zohara Yaniv-Bachrach, an ethnobotanist, researcher and lecturer in the field of medicinal plants. They live in the Yemin Moshe neighborhood of Jerusalem.
