= Nowe Batorowo =

- Village
- Location within Poland
- Coordinates: 54°14′12″N 19°20′14″E
- Country: Poland
- Voivodeship: Warmian-Masurian
- County: Elbląg
- Gmina: Elbląg

Nowe Batorowo [ˈnɔvɛ batɔˈrɔvɔ] is a village in the administrative district of Gmina Elbląg, within Elbląg County, Warmian-Masurian Voivodeship, in northern Poland.
