= Druzieńska Karczma =

- Settlement
- Location within Poland
- Coordinates: 54°4′35″N 19°29′36″E
- Country: Poland
- Voivodeship: Warmian-Masurian
- County: Elbląg
- Gmina: Elbląg

Druzieńska Karczma [druˈʑɛɲska ˈkart͡ʂma] is a settlement in the administrative district of Gmina Elbląg, within Elbląg County, Warmian-Masurian Voivodeship, in northern Poland.
