= Nowy Dwór, Elbląg County =

Nowy Dwór
- Village
- Location within Poland
- Coordinates: 54°3′44″N 19°32′8″E
- Country: Poland
- Voivodeship: Warmian-Masurian
- County: Elbląg
- Gmina: Elbląg
- Population: 100

Nowy Dwór [ˈnɔvɨ ˈdvur] is a village in the administrative district of Gmina Elbląg, within Elbląg County, Warmian-Masurian Voivodeship, in northern Poland.
