= Nowina, Warmian-Masurian Voivodeship =

Nowina
- Village
- Location within Poland
- Coordinates: 54°7′54″N 19°28′45″E
- Country: Poland
- Voivodeship: Warmian-Masurian
- County: Elbląg
- Gmina: Elbląg
- Population: 160

Nowina [nɔˈvina] is a village in the administrative district of Gmina Elbląg, within Elbląg County, Warmian-Masurian Voivodeship, in northern Poland.
