= Karczowizna =

- Village
- Location within Poland
- Coordinates: 54°3′0″N 19°32′9″E
- Country: Poland
- Voivodeship: Warmian-Masurian
- County: Elbląg
- Gmina: Elbląg

Karczowizna [kart͡ʂɔˈvizna] is a village in the administrative district of Gmina Elbląg, within Elbląg County, Warmian-Masurian Voivodeship, in northern Poland.
