= František Josef Studnička =

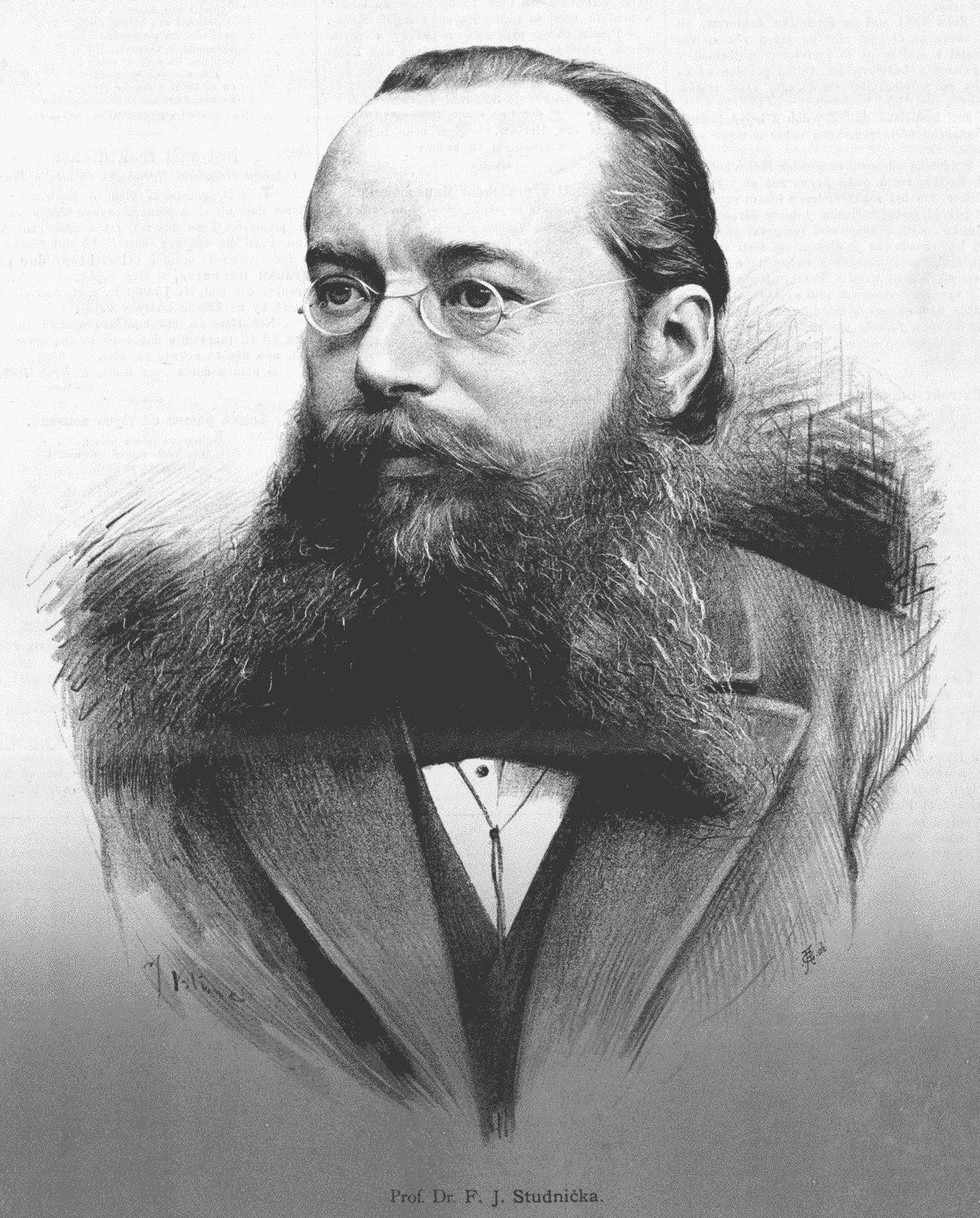
Portrait of Studnička by Jan Vilímek (1885)

František Josef Studnička (27 June 1836 – 21 February 1903) was a Czech mathematician, meteorologist and university pedagogue.

== Life ==
Studnička was born on 27 June 1836 in Janov, Bohemia, Austrian Empire (today part of Roudná, Czech Republic). He studied mathematics and physics at the University of Vienna, before teaching as a private tutor, at a high school in České Budějovice and at the Polytechnic in Prague. From 1871 until his death, he taught at Charles University in Prague. In 1888–1889, he was the rector of the university.

He was an active contributor to astronomy and meteorology. He was known as the author of several high school and university textbooks and popular articles.

In 1872, he became leader of the meteorological section of the Committee for Natural Science Research of Bohemia.

He died on 21 February 1903 in Prague. He is buried at the Olšany Cemetery in Prague.

== Publications ==
His publications include Bericht Uber Die Mathematischen Und Naturwissenschaftlichen Publikationen, Book 1: Abhandlungen Der Ersten Periode Betreffend (1884), Bericht Über die Mathematischen Und Naturwissenschaftlichen Publikationen der Kön. Böhm. Gesellschaft der Wissenschaften Während Ihres Hunderjährigen Bestandes (1885), Základové dešťopisu Království Českého (1886), Základové dešťopisu království Českého (1887), Kartografie či nauka o obraza povrchu zemského (1901) and Ueber das farbige Licht der Doppelsterne und einiger anderer gestirne des Himmels (1903).
