= Przezmark-Osiedle =

- Village
- Location within Poland
- Coordinates: 54°8′7″N 19°31′53″E
- Country: Poland
- Voivodeship: Warmian-Masurian
- County: Elbląg
- Gmina: Elbląg
- Population: 281

Przezmark-Osiedle [ˈpʂɛzmark ɔˈɕɛdlɛ] is a village in the administrative district of Gmina Elbląg, within Elbląg County, Warmian-Masurian Voivodeship, in northern Poland.
