= Bielnik Drugi =

- Village
- Location within Poland
- Coordinates: 54°11′20″N 19°19′35″E
- Country: Poland
- Voivodeship: Warmian-Masurian
- County: Elbląg
- Gmina: Elbląg
- Population: 280

Bielnik Drugi [ˈbjɛlnik ˈdruɡi] is a village in the administrative district of Gmina Elbląg, within Elbląg County, Warmian-Masurian Voivodeship, in northern Poland.
