= Komorowo Żuławskie =

- Village
- Location within Poland
- Coordinates: 54°6′25″N 19°30′38″E
- Country: Poland
- Voivodeship: Warmian-Masurian
- County: Elbląg
- Gmina: Elbląg
- Population: 170

Komorowo Żuławskie [kɔmɔˈrɔvɔ ʐuˈwafskʲɛ] is a village in the administrative district of Gmina Elbląg, within Elbląg County, Warmian-Masurian Voivodeship, in northern Poland.
