= Tropy Elbląskie =

- Village
- Location within Poland
- Coordinates: 54°6′53″N 19°23′53″E
- Country: Poland
- Voivodeship: Warmian-Masurian
- County: Elbląg
- Gmina: Elbląg
- Population: 120

Tropy Elbląskie [ˈtrɔpɨ ɛlˈblɔ̃skʲɛ] is a village in the administrative district of Gmina Elbląg, within Elbląg County, Warmian-Masurian Voivodeship, in northern Poland.
