= Czechowo, Warmian-Masurian Voivodeship =

Czechowo
- Village
- Location within Poland
- Coordinates: 54°8′6″N 19°29′33″E
- Country: Poland
- Voivodeship: Warmian-Masurian
- County: Elbląg
- Gmina: Elbląg
- Population: 60

Czechowo [t͡ʂɛˈxɔvɔ] is a village in the administrative district of Gmina Elbląg, within Elbląg County, Warmian-Masurian Voivodeship, in northern Poland.
