= Bielnik Pierwszy =

- Village
- Location within Poland
- Coordinates: 54°11′16″N 19°22′3″E
- Country: Poland
- Voivodeship: Warmian-Masurian
- County: Elbląg
- Gmina: Elbląg
- Population: 130

Bielnik Pierwszy [ˈbjɛlnik ˈpjɛrfʂɨ] is a village in the administrative district of Gmina Elbląg, within Elbląg County, Warmian-Masurian Voivodeship, in northern Poland.
