= Chlewki =

- Settlement
- Location within Poland
- Coordinates: 54°4′41″N 19°33′3″E
- Country: Poland
- Voivodeship: Warmian-Masurian
- County: Elbląg
- Gmina: Elbląg

Chlewki [ˈxlɛfki] is a settlement in the administrative district of Gmina Elbląg, within Elbląg County, Warmian-Masurian Voivodeship, in northern Poland.
