= Józefowo, Elbląg County =

Józefowo
- Village
- Location within Poland
- Coordinates: 54°10′52″N 19°18′8″E
- Country: Poland
- Voivodeship: Warmian-Masurian
- County: Elbląg
- Gmina: Elbląg

Józefowo (Polish: [juzɛˈfɔvɔ]) is a village in the administrative district of Gmina Elbląg, within Elbląg County, Warmian-Masurian Voivodeship, in northern Poland.
