= Gmina Elbląg =

Gmina Elbląg Elbląg Commune
- Gmina
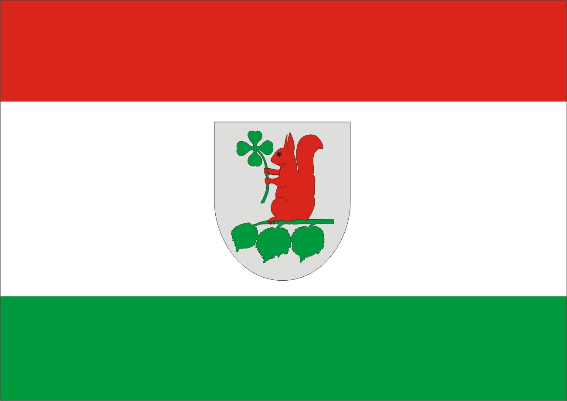
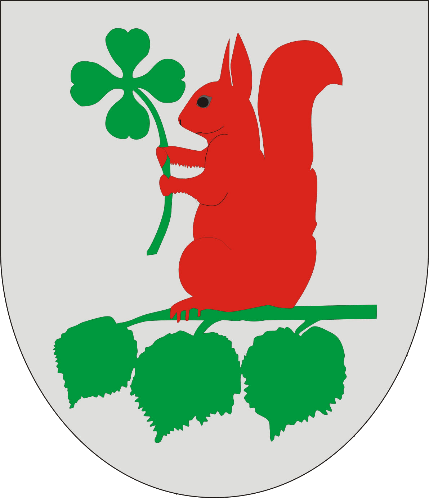
- Flag Coat of arms
- Interactive map of Gmina Elbląg
- Coordinates (Elbląg): 54°5′40″N 19°24′15″E
- Country: Poland
- Voivodeship: Warmian-Masurian
- County: Elbląg County
- Seat: Elbląg

Area
  - Total: 192.06 km^{2} (74.15 sq mi)

Population (2006)
  - Total: 6,462
  - Density: 33.65/km^{2} (87.14/sq mi)
- Website: http://www.gminaelblag.pl

Gmina Elbląg is a rural gmina (administrative district) in Elbląg County, Warmian-Masurian Voivodeship, in northern Poland. Its seat is the town of Elbląg, although the town is not part of the territory of the gmina.

The gmina covers an area of 192.06 square kilometres (74.2 sq mi), and as of 2006, its total population is 6,462.

The gmina contains part of the protected area called Elbląg Upland Landscape Park.

== Villages ==
Gmina Elbląg contains the villages and settlements of Adamowo, Adamowo-Osiedle, Batorowo, Bielnik Drugi, Bielnik Pierwszy, Bogaczewo, Chlewki, Cieplice, Czechowo, Dłużyna, Dolna Kępa, Druzieńska Karczma, Drużno, Gronowo Górne, Gronowo Górne-Osiedle, Helenowo, Jagodno, Janów, Janowo, Józefowo, Karczowizna, Kazimierzewo, Kępa Rybacka, Kępiny Wielkie, Klepa, Komorowo Żuławskie, Krzyż, Lisów, Myślęcin, Nowa Pilona, Nowakowo, Nowakowo Trzecie, Nowe Batorowo, Nowina, Nowotki, Nowy Dwór, Pasieki, Pilona, Przezmark, Przezmark-Osiedle, Raczki Elbląskie, Rybaki, Sierpin, Tropy Elbląskie, Ujście, Weklice, Węzina, Władysławowo and Zaścianek.

== Neighbouring gminas ==
Gmina Elbląg is bordered by the city of Elbląg and by the gminas of Gronowo Elbląskie, Markusy, Milejewo, Nowy Dwór Gdański, Pasłęk, Rychliki and Tolkmicko.

== External ==
- Elbing area before WW2
