= Myślęcin, Warmian-Masurian Voivodeship =

Myślęcin
- Village
- Location within Poland
- Coordinates: 54°6′27″N 19°32′33″E
- Country: Poland
- Voivodeship: Warmian-Masurian
- County: Elbląg
- Gmina: Elbląg
- Population: 90

Myślęcin [mɨˈɕlɛnt͡ɕin] is a village in the administrative district of Gmina Elbląg, within Elbląg County, Warmian-Masurian Voivodeship, in northern Poland.
