= Nowotki =

- Village
- Location within Poland
- Coordinates: 54°15′28″N 19°18′21″E
- Country: Poland
- Voivodeship: Warmian-Masurian
- County: Elbląg
- Gmina: Elbląg
- Population: 130

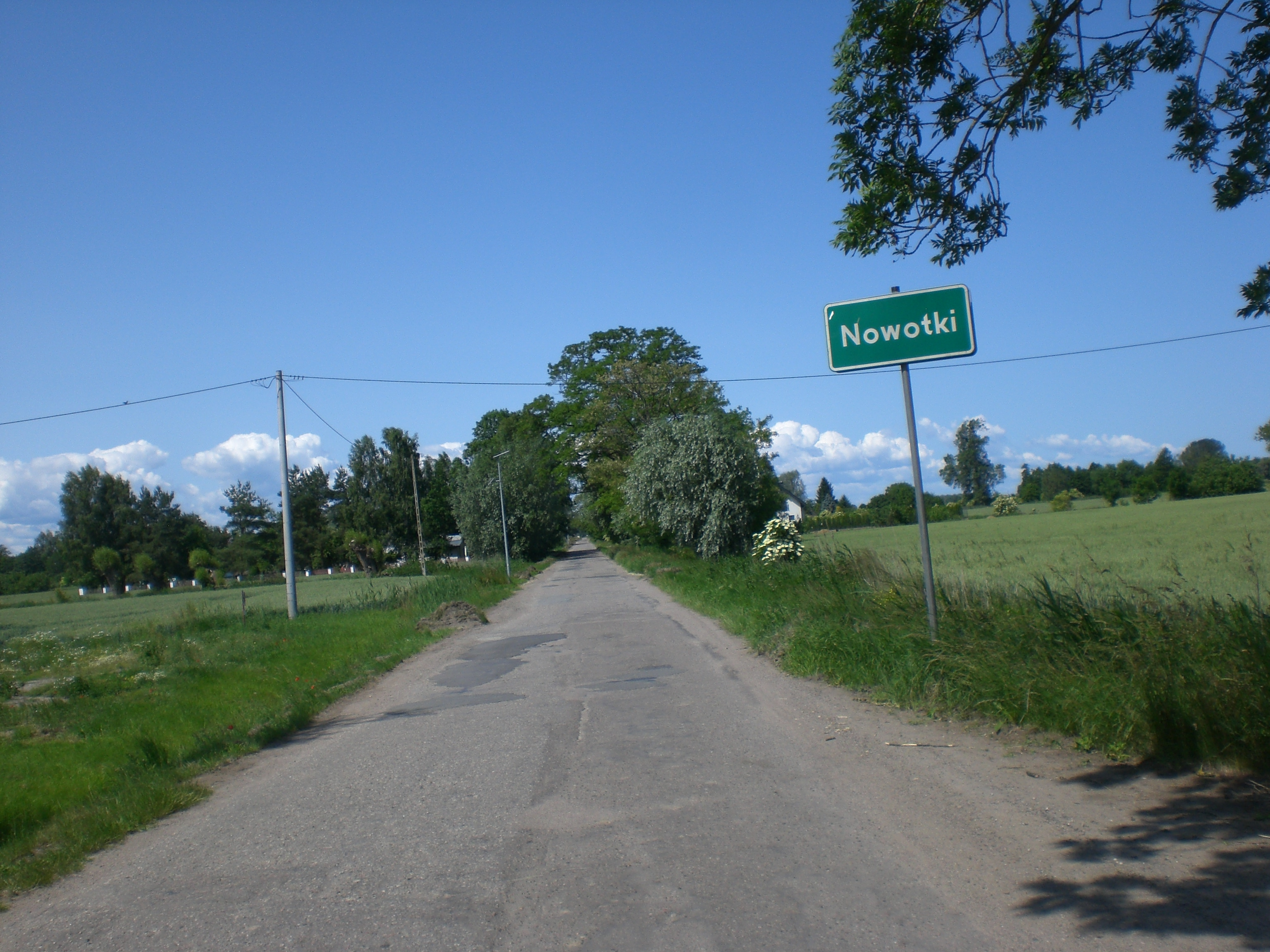
Nowotki

Nowotki [nɔˈvɔtki] is a village in the administrative district of Gmina Elbląg, within Elbląg County, Warmian-Masurian Voivodeship, in northern Poland.
