= Bogaczewo, Elbląg County =

Bogaczewo
- Village
- Location within Poland
- Coordinates: 54°5′57″N 19°34′36″E
- Country: Poland
- Voivodeship: Warmian-Masurian
- County: Elbląg
- Gmina: Elbląg

Bogaczewo [bɔɡaˈt͡ʂɛvɔ] is a village in the administrative district of Gmina Elbląg, within Elbląg County, Warmian-Masurian Voivodeship, in northern Poland.
