= Pilona, Poland =

Pilona
- Village
- Location within Poland
- Coordinates: 54°6′27″N 19°31′28″E
- Country: Poland
- Voivodeship: Warmian-Masurian
- County: Elbląg
- Gmina: Elbląg
- Population: 100

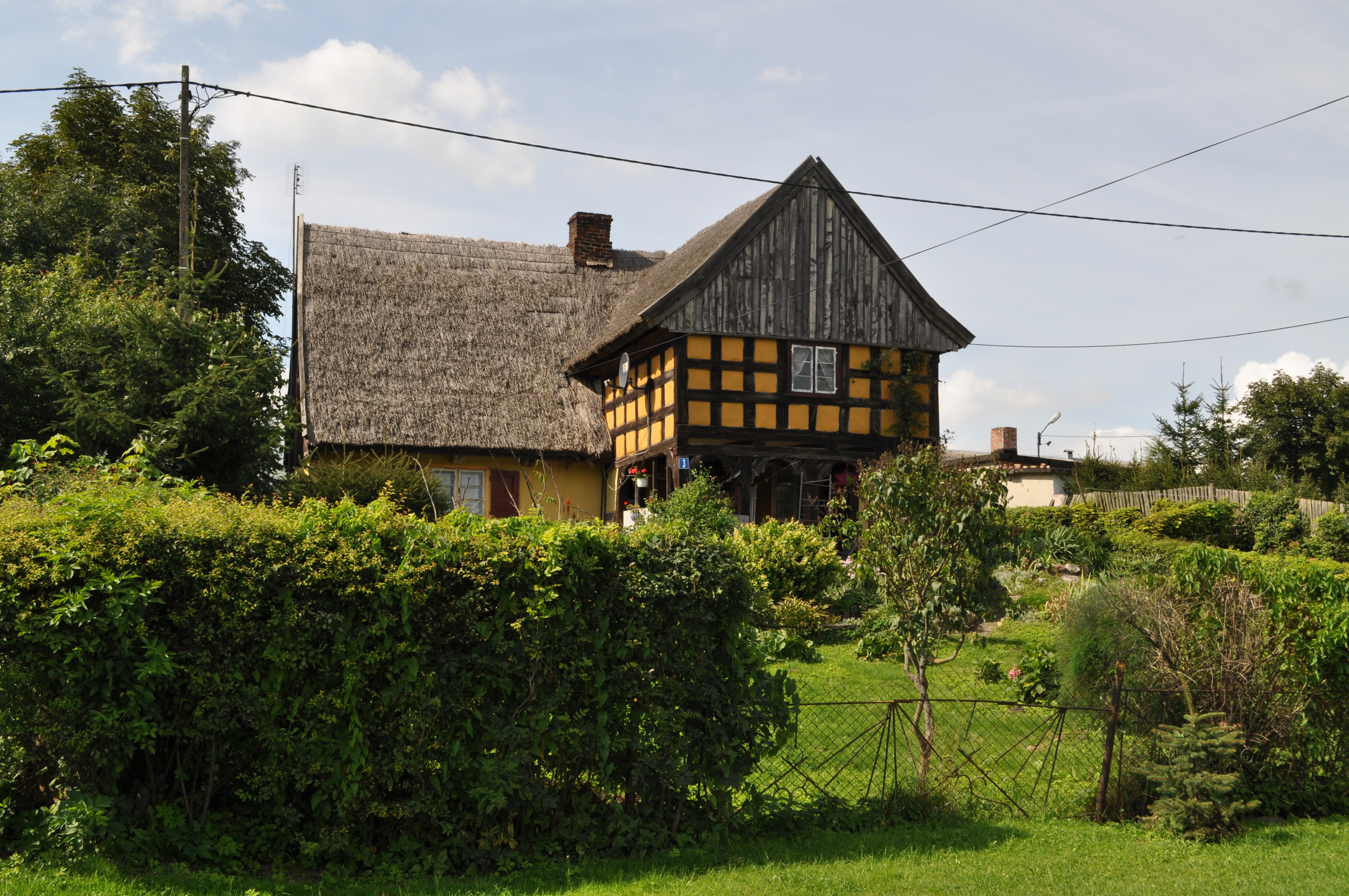
Pilona, dom podcieniowy

Pilona [piˈlɔna] is a village in the administrative district of Gmina Elbląg, within Elbląg County, Warmian-Masurian Voivodeship, in northern Poland.
