= Węzina, Warmian-Masurian Voivodeship =

Węzina
- Village
- Location within Poland
- Coordinates: 54°4′40″N 19°30′57″E
- Country: Poland
- Voivodeship: Warmian-Masurian
- County: Elbląg
- Gmina: Elbląg
- Population: 140

Węzina [vɛ̃ˈʑina] is a village in the administrative district of Gmina Elbląg, within Elbląg County, Warmian-Masurian Voivodeship, in northern Poland.
