= Adamowo-Osiedle =

- Village
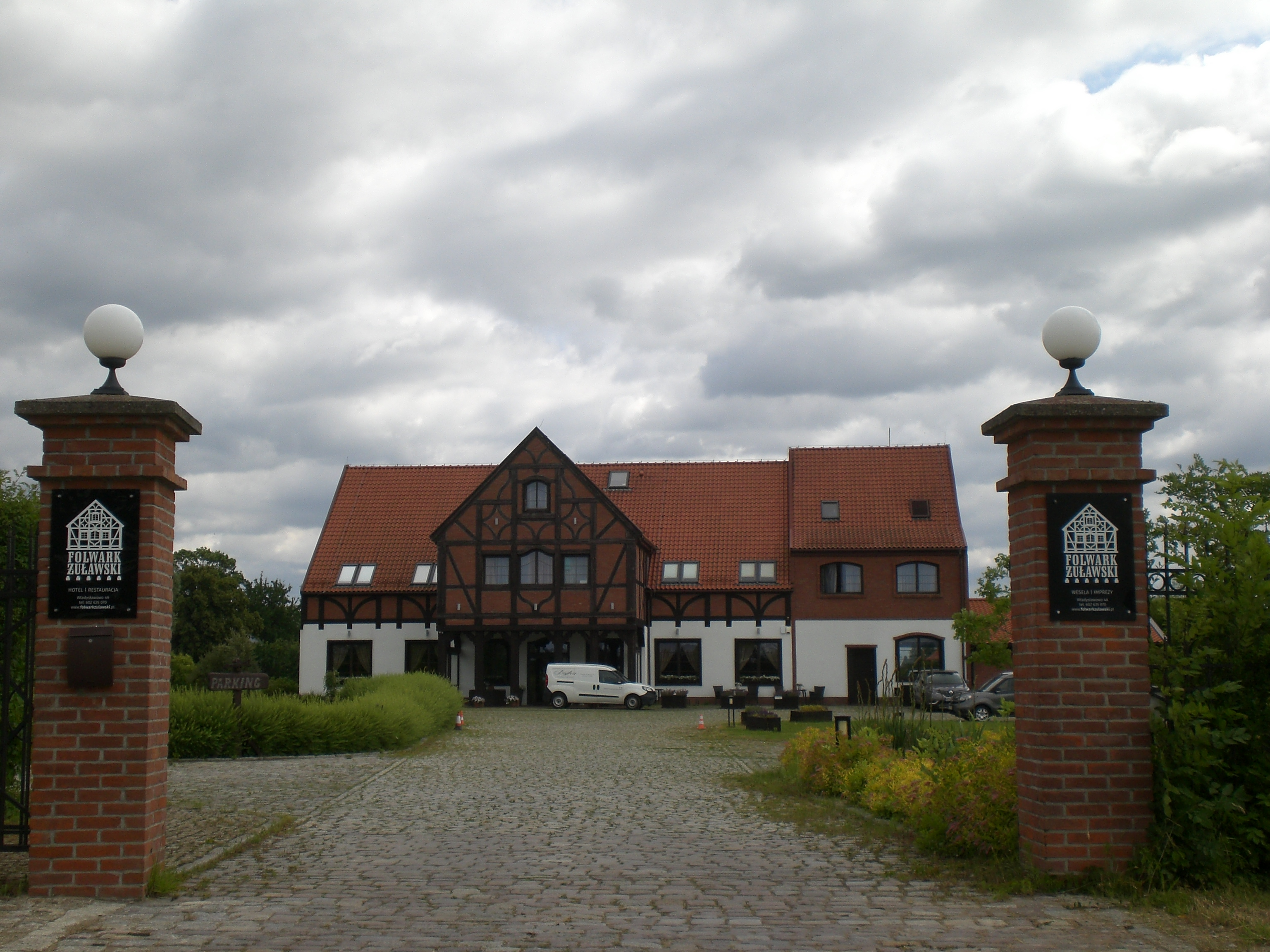
- Adamowo-Osiedle, folwark

- Location within Poland
- Coordinates: 54°9′37″N 19°19′45″E
- Country: Poland
- Voivodeship: Warmian-Masurian
- County: Elbląg
- Gmina: Elbląg

Adamowo-Osiedle [adaˈmɔvɔ ɔˈɕɛdlɛ] is a village in the administrative district of Gmina Elbląg, within Elbląg County, Warmian-Masurian Voivodeship, in northern Poland.
