= Krzyż, Warmian-Masurian Voivodeship =

Village in Warmian-Masurian Voivodeship, Poland

Krzyż
- Village
- Location within Poland
- Coordinates: 54°5′15″N 19°30′39″E
- Country: Poland
- Voivodeship: Warmian-Masurian
- County: Elbląg
- Gmina: Elbląg

Krzyż [kʂɨʂ] is a village in the administrative district of Gmina Elbląg, within Elbląg County, Warmian-Masurian Voivodeship, in northern Poland.
