= Dolna Kępa =

- Settlement
- Location within Poland
- Coordinates: 54°13′45″N 19°18′52″E
- Country: Poland
- Voivodeship: Warmian-Masurian
- County: Elbląg
- Gmina: Elbląg

Dolna Kępa [ˈdɔlna ˈkɛmpa] is a settlement in the administrative district of Gmina Elbląg, within Elbląg County, Warmian-Masurian Voivodeship, in northern Poland.
