= Weklice =

- Village
- Location within Poland
- Coordinates: 54°6′55″N 19°34′23″E
- Country: Poland
- Voivodeship: Warmian-Masurian
- County: Elbląg
- Gmina: Elbląg
- Population: 110

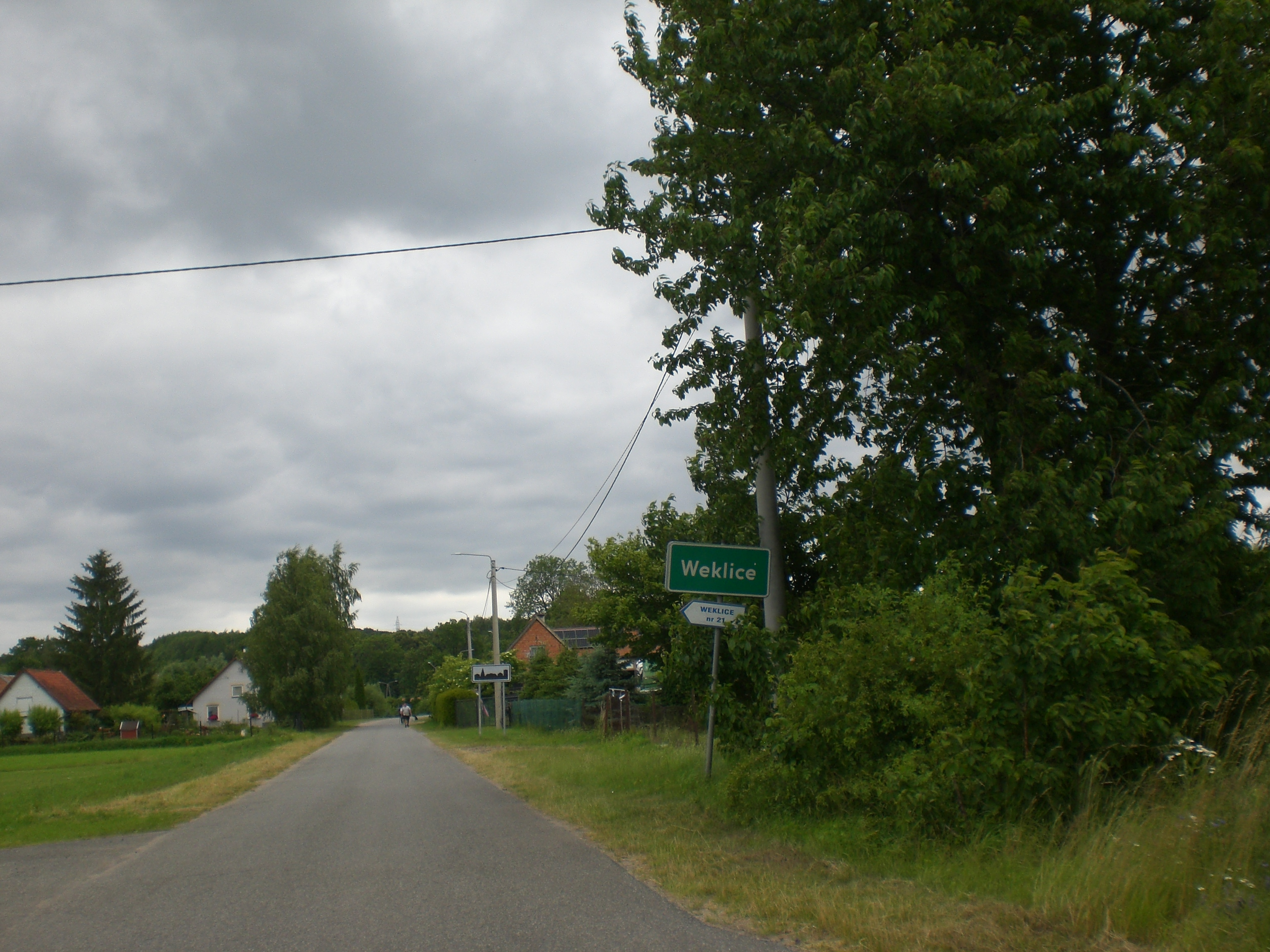
Weklice 1736

Weklice [vɛˈklit͡sɛ] is a village in the administrative district of Gmina Elbląg, within Elbląg County, Warmian-Masurian Voivodeship, in northern Poland.
