= Drużno, Warmian-Masurian Voivodeship =

Drużno
- Village
- Location within Poland
- Coordinates: 54°3′40″N 19°33′5″E
- Country: Poland
- Voivodeship: Warmian-Masurian
- County: Elbląg
- Gmina: Elbląg
- Population: 90

Drużno [ˈdruʐnɔ] is a village in the administrative district of Gmina Elbląg, within Elbląg County, Warmian-Masurian Voivodeship, in northern Poland.

The village shares its name with Drużno Lake.
