= Lisów, Warmian-Masurian Voivodeship =

Lisów
- Village
- Location within Poland
- Coordinates: 54°3′42″N 19°33′35″E
- Country: Poland
- Voivodeship: Warmian-Masurian
- County: Elbląg
- Gmina: Elbląg
- Population: 120

Lisów [ˈlisuf] is a village in the administrative district of Gmina Elbląg, within Elbląg County, Warmian-Masurian Voivodeship, in northern Poland.
