= Klepa, Poland =

Klepa
- Village
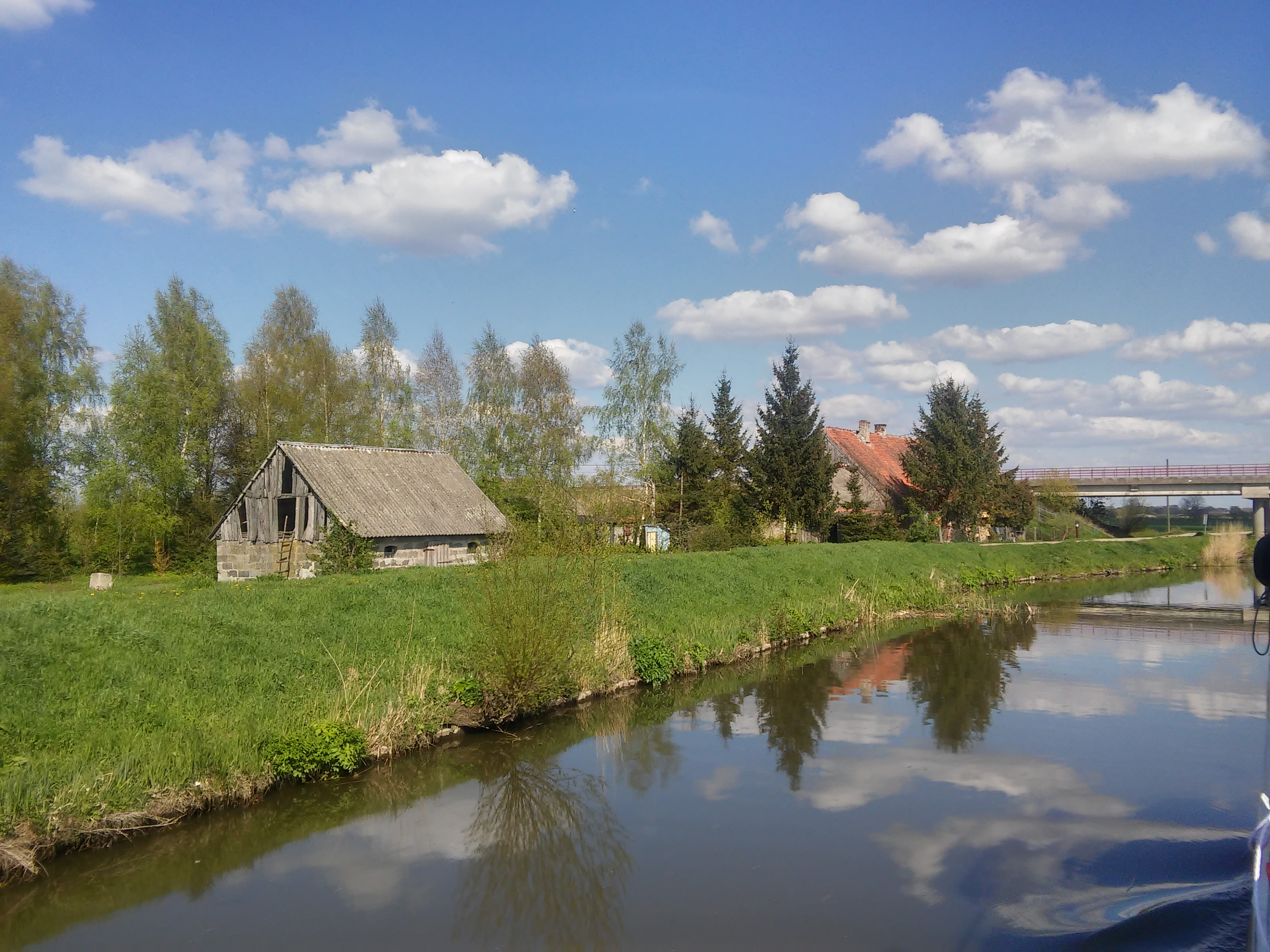

- Location within Poland
- Coordinates: 54°3′4″N 19°31′13″E
- Country: Poland
- Voivodeship: Warmian-Masurian
- County: Elbląg
- Gmina: Elbląg

Klepa [ˈklɛpa] is a village in the administrative district of Gmina Elbląg, within Elbląg County, Warmian-Masurian Voivodeship, in northern Poland.
