= Cieplice, Warmian-Masurian Voivodeship =

Cieplice
- Village
- Location within Poland
- Coordinates: 54°15′8″N 19°20′29″E
- Country: Poland
- Voivodeship: Warmian-Masurian
- County: Elbląg
- Gmina: Elbląg
- Population: 170

Cieplice [t͡ɕɛˈplit͡sɛ] is a village in the administrative district of Gmina Elbląg, within Elbląg County, Warmian-Masurian Voivodeship, in northern Poland.
