= Ujście, Elbląg County =

Ujście
- Settlement
- Location within Poland
- Coordinates: 54°14′3″N 19°21′53″E
- Country: Poland
- Voivodeship: Warmian-Masurian
- County: Elbląg
- Gmina: Elbląg

Ujście [ˈui̯ɕt͡ɕɛ] is a settlement in the administrative district of Gmina Elbląg, within Elbląg County, Warmian-Masurian Voivodeship, in northern Poland.
