= Sierpin =

- Village
- Location within Poland
- Coordinates: 54°8′59″N 19°31′14″E
- Country: Poland
- Voivodeship: Warmian-Masurian
- County: Elbląg
- Gmina: Elbląg
- Population: 70

Sierpin [ˈɕɛrpin] (German name: Serpin) is a village in the administrative district of Gmina Elbląg, within Elbląg County, Warmian-Masurian Voivodeship, in northern Poland.
