= Janowo, Elbląg County =

Janowo
- Village
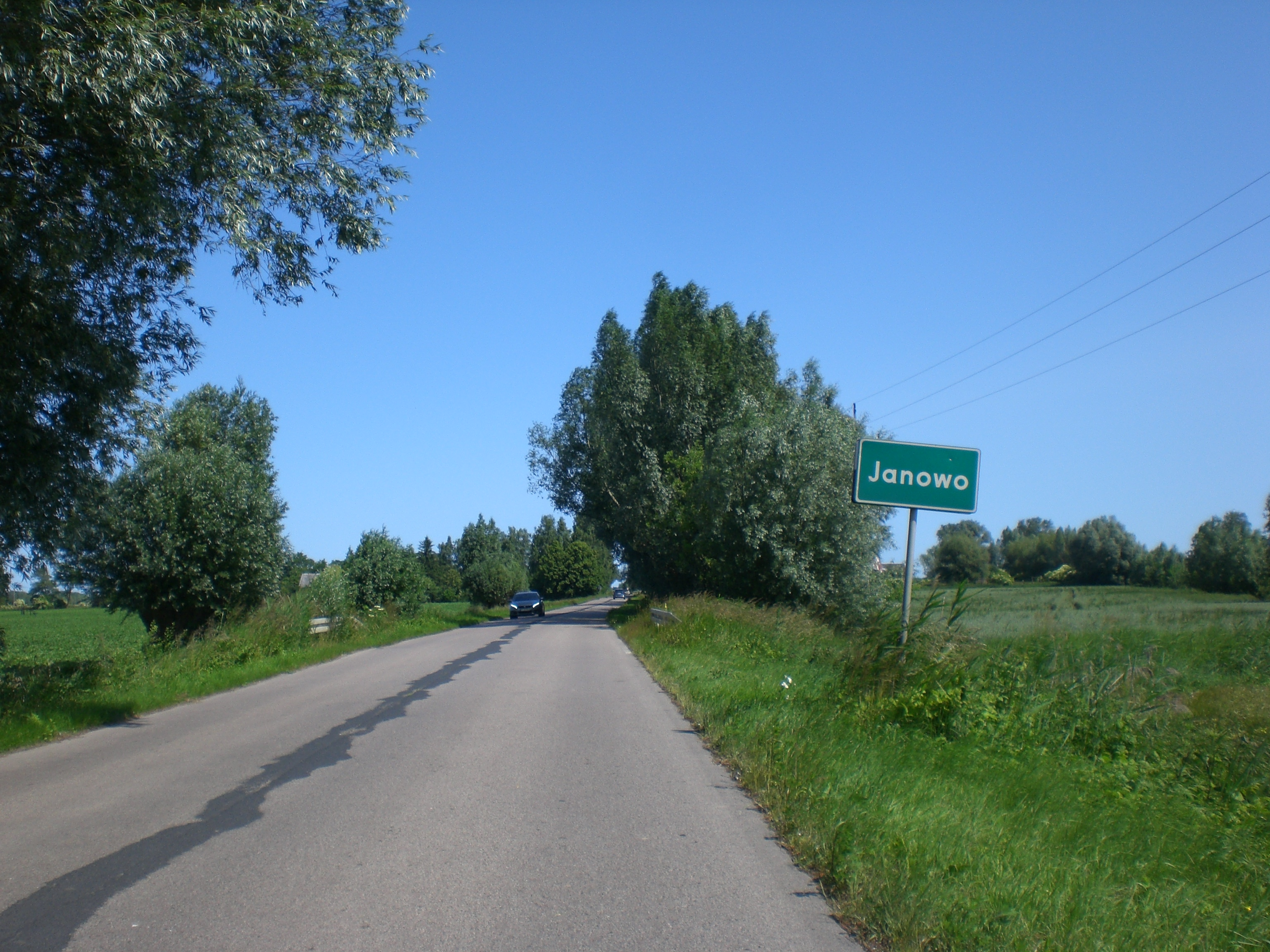

- Location within Poland
- Coordinates: 54°10′27″N 19°18′52″E
- Country: Poland
- Voivodeship: Warmian-Masurian
- County: Elbląg
- Gmina: Elbląg
- Population: 160

Janowo [jaˈnɔvɔ] is a village in the administrative district of Gmina Elbląg, within Elbląg County, Warmian-Masurian Voivodeship, in northern Poland.
