= Roudná =

- Municipality
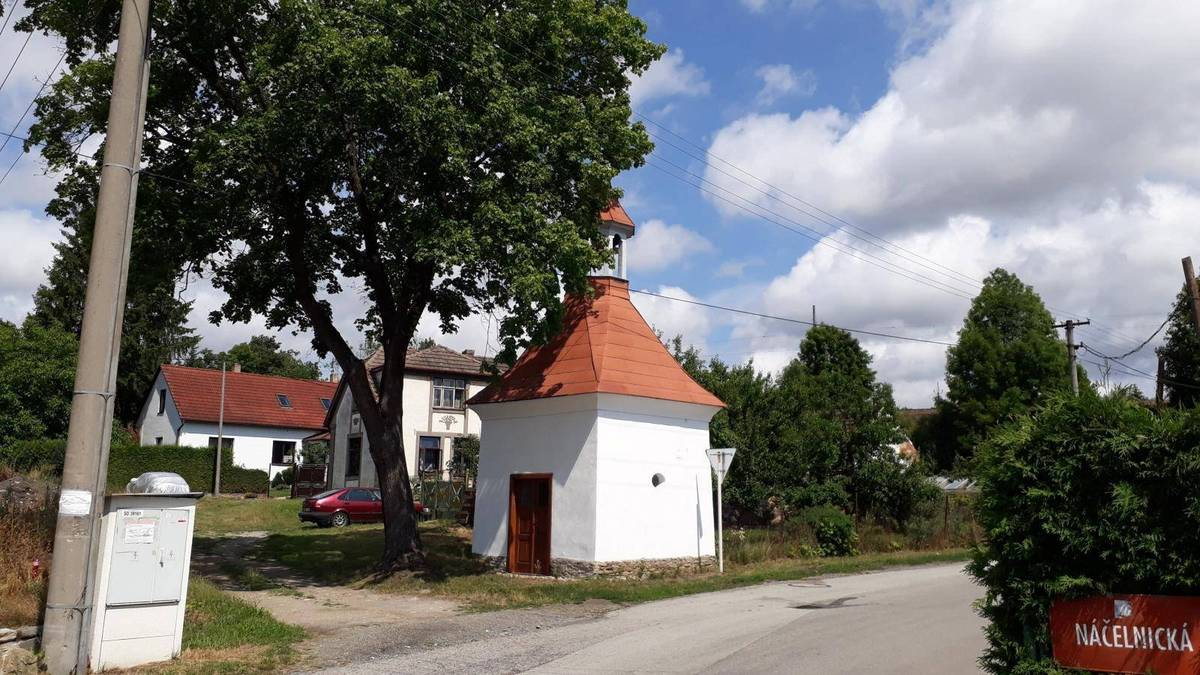
- A chapel in Roudná

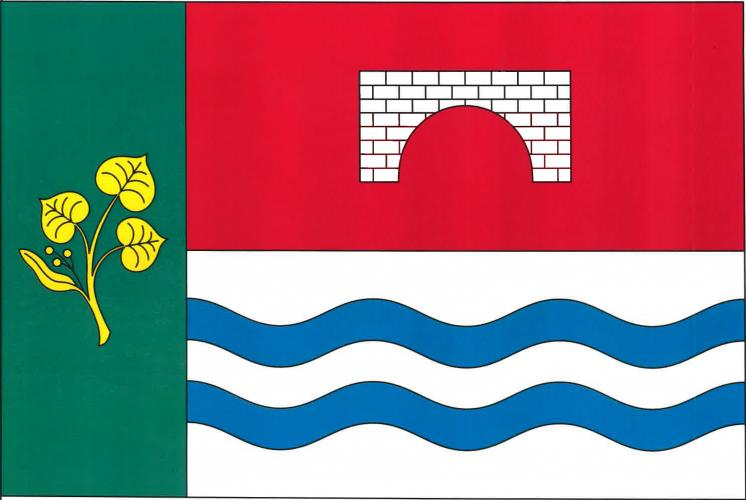
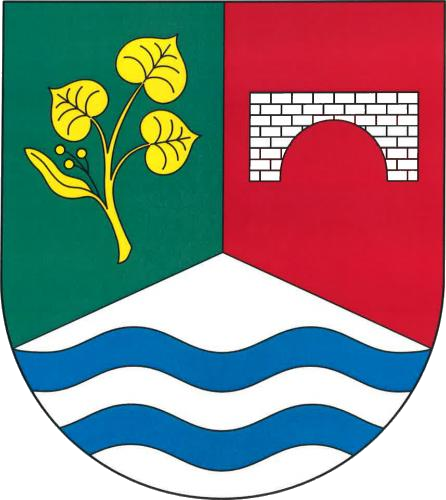
- Flag Coat of arms

- Location in the Czech Republic
- Coordinates: 49°18′16″N 14°43′7″E
- Country: Czech Republic
- Region: South Bohemian
- District: Tábor
- First mentioned: 1381

Area
  - Total: 3.65 km^{2} (1.41 sq mi)
- Elevation: 400 m (1,300 ft)

Population (2026-01-01)
  - Total: 574
  - Density: 157/km^{2} (407/sq mi)
- Time zone: UTC+1 (CET)
  - Summer (DST): UTC+2 (CEST)
- Postal code: 392 01
- Website: www.obecroudna.cz

Roudná is a municipality and village in Tábor District in the South Bohemian Region of the Czech Republic. It has about 600 inhabitants.

Roudná lies approximately 14 kilometres (9 mi) south of Tábor, 41 km (25 mi) north-east of České Budějovice, and 90 km (56 mi) south of Prague.

== Administrative division ==
Roudná consists of two municipal parts (in brackets population according to the 2021 census):

- Roudná (424)
- Janov (123)

== Demographics ==
Historical population
Year	Pop.	±%
1869	548	—
1880	455	−17.0%
1890	393	−13.6%
1900	393	+0.0%
1910	370	−5.9%
1921	360	−2.7%
1930	464	+28.9%
1950	498	+7.3%
1961	533	+7.0%
1970	533	+0.0%
1980	503	−5.6%
1991	496	−1.4%
2001	520	+4.8%
2011	514	−1.2%
2021	547	+6.4%
Source: Censuses

== Notable people ==
- František Josef Studnička (1836–1903), mathematician and meteorologist
