= Janov (Rakovník District) =

- Municipality
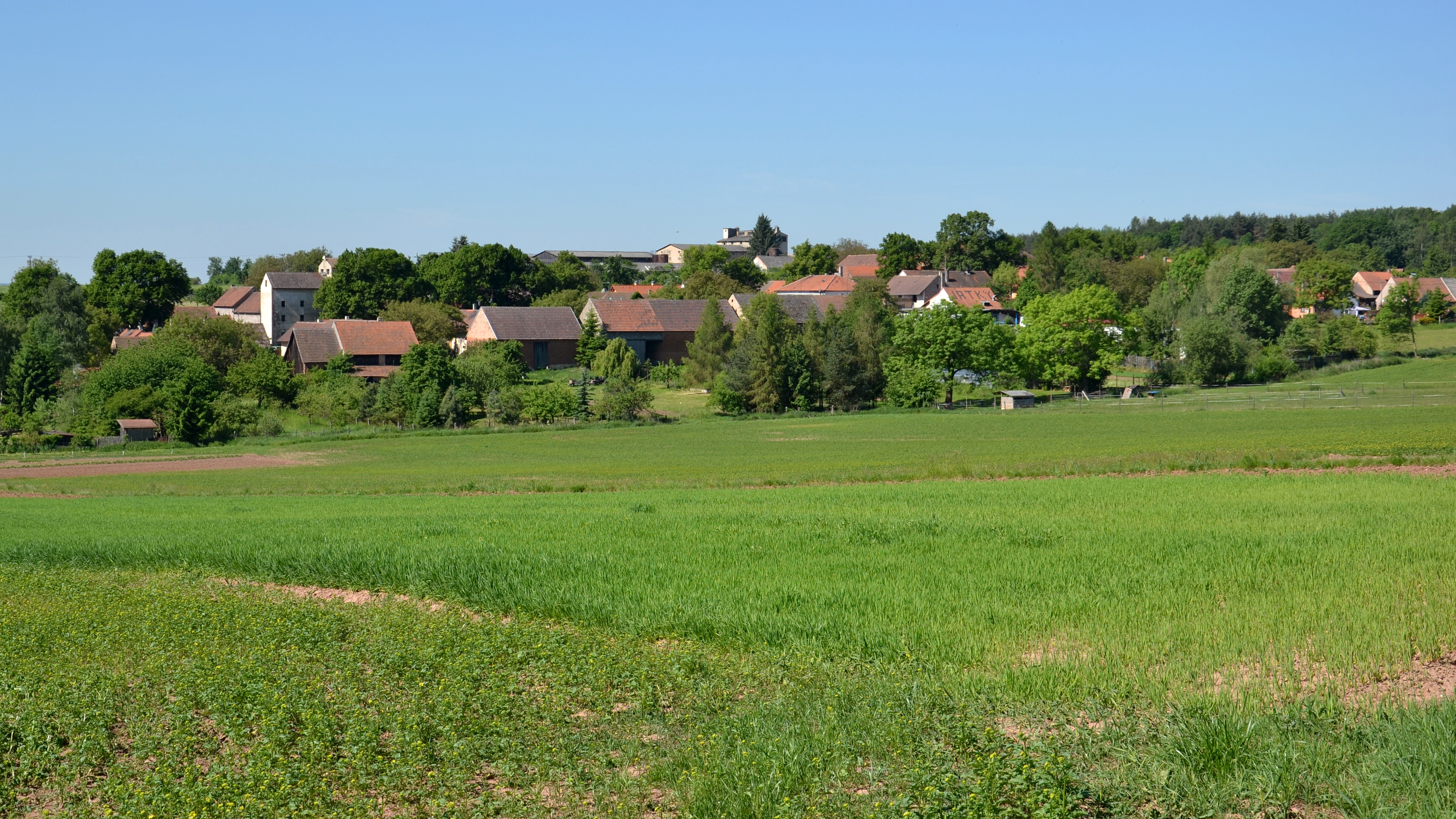
- View from the north

- Flag Coat of arms

- Location in the Czech Republic
- Coordinates: 50°12′38″N 13°38′24″E
- Country: Czech Republic
- Region: Central Bohemian
- District: Rakovník
- Founded: 1771

Area
  - Total: 3.16 km^{2} (1.22 sq mi)
- Elevation: 427 m (1,401 ft)

Population (2026-01-01)
  - Total: 149
  - Density: 47.2/km^{2} (122/sq mi)
- Time zone: UTC+1 (CET)
  - Summer (DST): UTC+2 (CEST)
- Postal code: 270 06
- Website: www.obec-janov.cz

Janov is a municipality and village in Rakovník District in the Central Bohemian Region of the Czech Republic. It has about 100 inhabitants.

== Demographics ==
Historical population
Year	Pop.	±%
1869	292	—
1880	267	−8.6%
1890	303	+13.5%
1900	316	+4.3%
1910	290	−8.2%
1921	308	+6.2%
1930	308	+0.0%
1950	218	−29.2%
1961	207	−5.0%
1970	168	−18.8%
1980	142	−15.5%
1991	118	−16.9%
2001	100	−15.3%
2011	116	+16.0%
2021	140	+20.7%
Source: Censuses
