= Zohara Yaniv =

Israeli academic

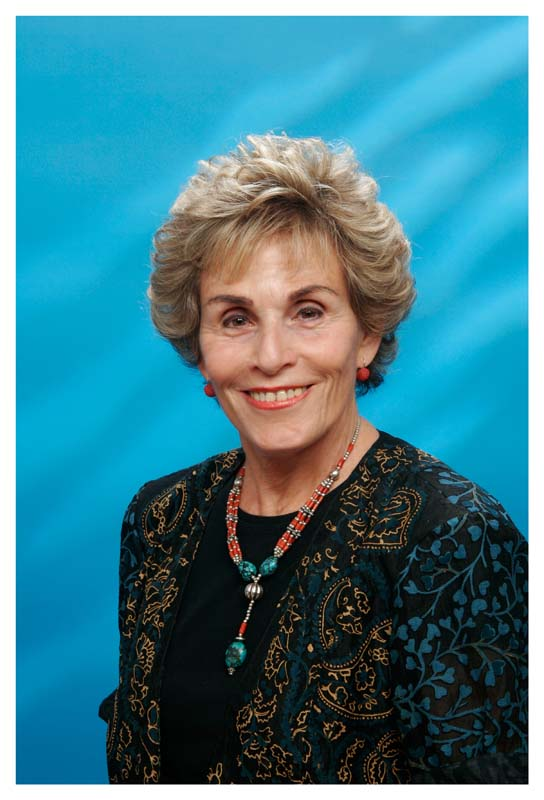
Zohara yaniv

Zohara Yaniv – Bachrach (Hebrew: זהרה יניב-בכרך; born 1937) is an ethnobotanist, researcher and lecturer in the field of medicinal plants.

== Areas of scientific study ==
Professor Yaniv specializes in the field of Medicinal Plants and in Ethnobotanical research, biochemistry of secondary metabolites, effect of metabolites of higher plants as potential drugs and biodiversity of native plants and its preservation. She also deals with the development of new crops, mainly from oil plants, and studies oil quality of seeds and its effect on nutritional supplements.

== Biography ==
=== Early years ===
Zohara Yaniv was born in Tel Aviv, Israel in 1937. After completing three years of military service in nahal, she pursued her botany studies (MSc) at the Hebrew University of Jerusalem (1957–1962).

=== Researcher at the Boyce Thompson Institute for Plant Research and the Agriculture Research Center (ARO) ===
On completion of her PhD studies in plant biochemistry at the Dept. of Biological Sciences, Columbia University, New York in 1967, Yaniv came to the Boyce Thompson Institute for Plant Research, Yonkers, N.Y, as a postdoctoral research fellow and stayed there as a researcher for 11 years. Yaniv's research studies involved the ribosomal activities in uredospores of the bean rust fungus and its role in spore germination and senescence with the hope of better understanding the mechanism of obligate parasitism.

During the summers of 1968–1977, she was an instructor in the NSF Student Science Training Program at BTI, and during 1976–1977, she was the director of this program.

In 1978, Zohara moved back to Israel, where she was appointed as a Senior Scientist at the then newly formed Department of Medicinal Plants, at the Agriculture Research Center (ARO), Beit Dagan, Israel. Yaniv worked there until her retirement in 2002.

Zohara Yaniv's research involved ethnobotanical studies of medicinal plants in Israel, as well as studies related to the effect of the environment on secondary metabolites. She was a visiting scientist at the NIH, Bethesda, Maryland (1987), as well as at the University of Paris (1995), and acted as visiting professor at the university in Vienna and at the Academy of Science in Shanghai, China (2001–2000). For six summers she conducted an international course in ethnobotany at MAICH Chania in Crete, Greece.

=== International cooperation in agricultural research ===
In 1993 Zohara was appointed as Director of the Unit of International Cooperation of the Agricultural Research Organization (ARO). In this capacity, she was responsible for international PR of the ARO, and was also in charge of fundraising for agricultural research in Israel. Yaniv's activities included arranging Memorandum of Understanding (MOU) for joint collaborations in scientific research between the ARO and universities and research institutions in various countries and supervising international courses conducted at the ARO. Yaniv also supervised the training program of foreign trainees who carry out their training in various institutes with individual scientists at the ARO, as well as in her own laboratory.

=== Teaching and professional activities ===
At present, Yaniv is an adjunct Professor in the Hebrew University of Jerusalem where she handles the academic study and research of Medicinal Plants. In the last few years, Yaniv has been invited to teach a post-graduate course on the "Biology and Utilization of Aromatic and Medicinal Plants in the Mediterranean Area" at the Mediterranean Agronomic Institute in Chania, Greece.

Yaniv is also founder and chairman of the board of directors of the Israeli Association for medicinal plants (Eilam).

=== Family ===
Yaniv is married to Israeli microbiologist Uriel Bachrach.

== Selected Books and Book Chapters ==
- Palevitch, D., Yaniv, Z., Dafni, A., and Friedman, J. 1986. Medicinal plants of Israel – a field survey. Herbs, spices and Medicinal Plants. L.E. Cracker and J. Simon (Eds) Oryx Press. pp. 281 – 345
- Yaniv Z., and Bachrach U. 2002. Roots as a source of metabolites with medicinal activity. In: Plant Roots The Hidden Half. 3rd Edition. Waissel Y., Eshel A. and Kafkafi U. (Eds). M. Dekker, Inc. N.Y.1071–1091
- Yaniv Z. 2005. Medicinal Plants of the Bible. In: VEN. Viennese Ethnomedicine Newsletter. Vol.7, No.2.
- Palevitch, and Z. Yaniv. 2000. Medicinal Plants of the Holy Land. Modan Pub. Tel-Aviv. Israel. 358 pp.
- Yaniv, Z. and U. Bachrach. 2005. Handbook of Medicinal Plants. The Haworth Press. NY.500 pp.
- Yaniv Z, Dudai, N and Bachrach, U. 2012. Artemisia spp. In: Singh, Ram J. (editor.) Genetic Resources, Chromosome Engineering, and Crop Improvement. Volume 6: medicinal Plants. CRC press.327–352
- Yaniv, Z and N.Dudai. 2014. Medicinal and Aromatic Plants of the Middle-East. Springer Press. NY. 337 pp.

== Awards ==
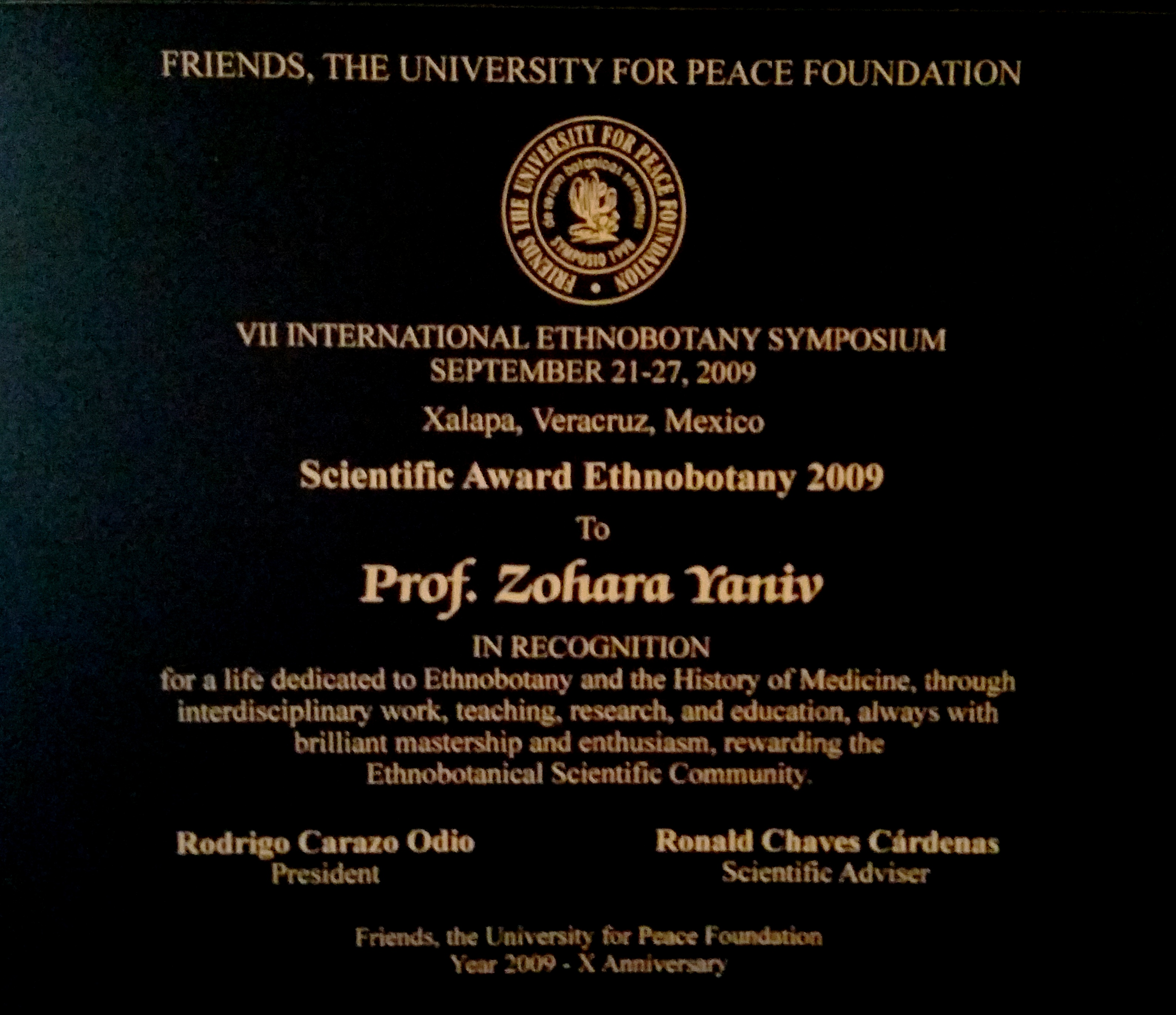
Distinguished Scientist Award

In 2009, Yaniv received the Life and Mastership in Pharmacognosy, Ethnobotany and the History of Ancient Medicine Awarded by the Friends from the University for Peace Foundation, Costa – Rica.

In 2020, Yaniv was awarded a Certificate of Appreciation for Lifetime Achievement for her unique contribution to science and the world of medicinal plants in Israel, on behalf of Eilam, the Israeli Association of Medicinal Plants.
