= Nowakowo =

- Village
- Location within Poland
- Coordinates: 54°13′28″N 19°21′29″E
- Country: Poland
- Voivodeship: Warmian-Masurian
- County: Elbląg
- Gmina: Elbląg
- Population: 400

Nowakowo [nɔvaˈkɔvɔ] is a village in the administrative district of Gmina Elbląg, within Elbląg County, Warmian-Masurian Voivodeship, in northern Poland.
