= Janowo, Bytów County =

Janowo
- Settlement
- Location within Poland
- Coordinates: 54°1′55″N 17°13′28″E
- Country: Poland
- Voivodeship: Pomeranian
- County: Bytów
- Gmina: Lipnica
- Population: 14

Janowo [jaˈnɔvɔ] is a settlement in the administrative district of Gmina Lipnica, within Bytów County, Pomeranian Voivodeship, in northern Poland.

For details of the history of the region, see History of Pomerania.
