= Janów, Warmian-Masurian Voivodeship =

Janów
- Village
- Location within Poland
- Coordinates: 54°6′38″N 19°29′26″E
- Country: Poland
- Voivodeship: Warmian-Masurian
- County: Elbląg
- Gmina: Elbląg
- Population: 360

Janów [ˈjanuf] is a village in the administrative district of Gmina Elbląg, within Elbląg County, Warmian-Masurian Voivodeship, in northern Poland.

Before 1772 the area was part of Kingdom of Poland, and in 1772–1945 it belonged to Prussia and Germany (East Prussia).

According to modern archaeological research, the village is the site of the medieval Old Prussian town and trading emporium Truso.
