= Batorowo, Warmian-Masurian Voivodeship =

Batorowo
- Village
- Location within Poland
- Coordinates: 54°14′49″N 19°21′15″E
- Country: Poland
- Voivodeship: Warmian-Masurian
- County: Elbląg
- Gmina: Elbląg

Batorowo [batɔˈrɔvɔ] is a village in the administrative district of Gmina Elbląg, within Elbląg County, Warmian-Masurian Voivodeship, in northern Poland.
