= Staré Hobzí =

- Municipality
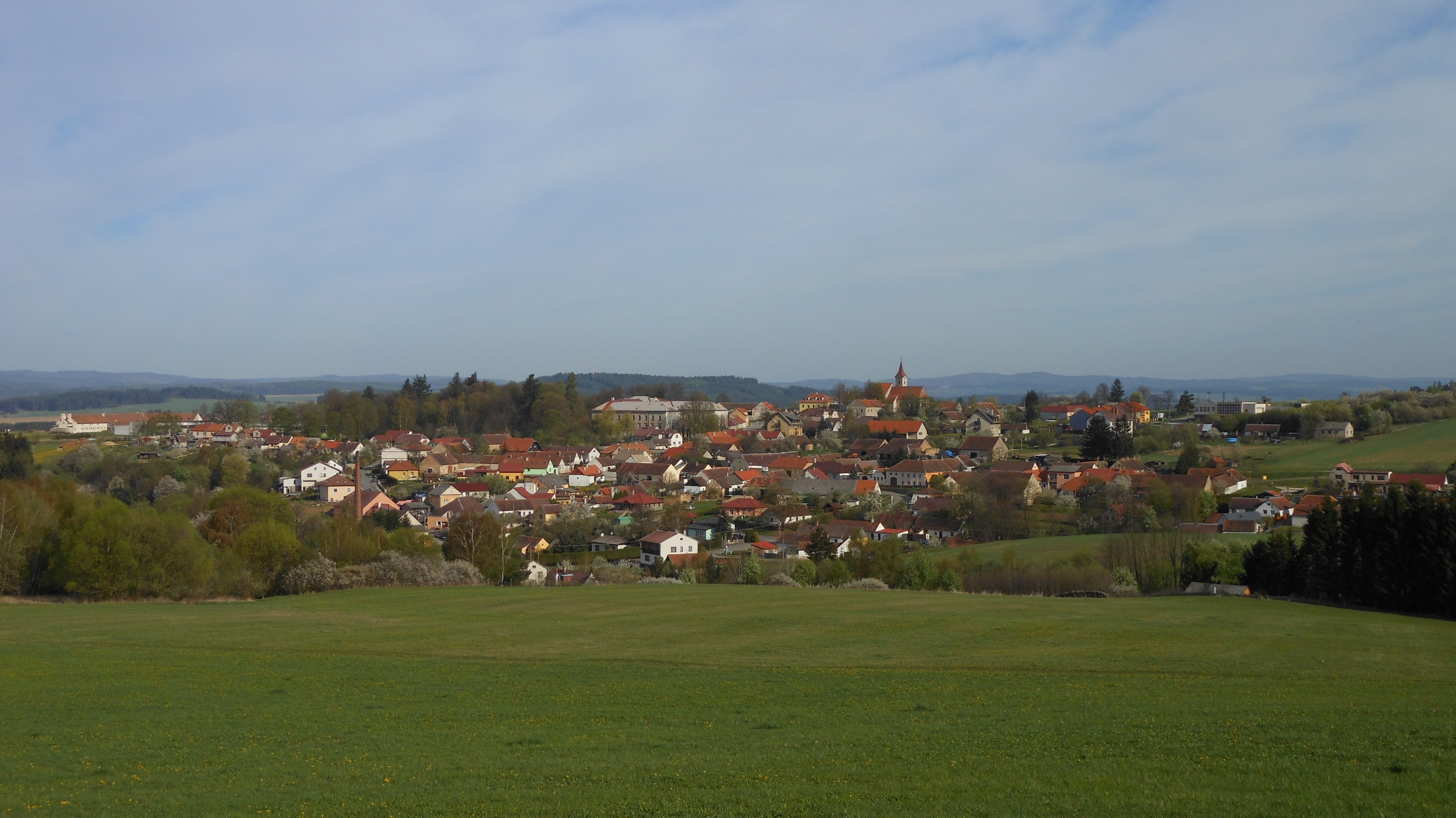
- General view

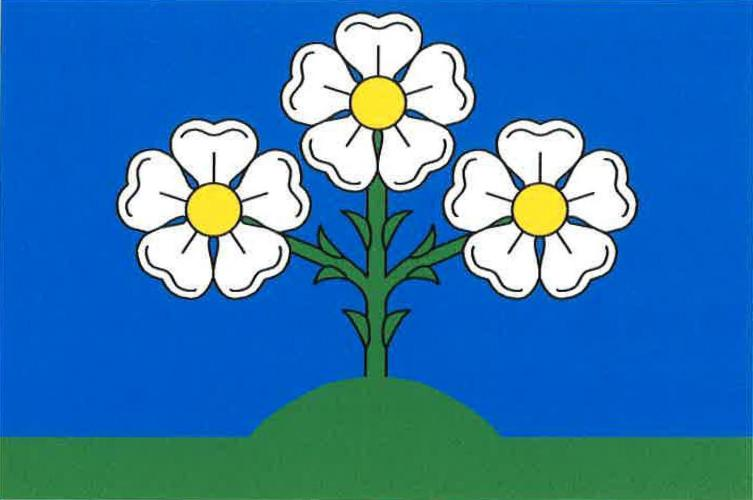
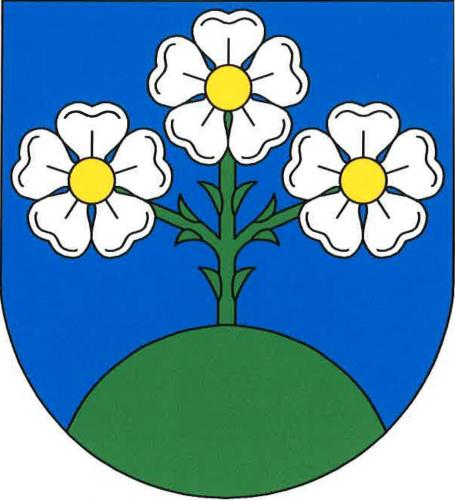
- Flag Coat of arms

- Location in the Czech Republic
- Coordinates: 49°0′38″N 15°27′12″E
- Country: Czech Republic
- Region: South Bohemian
- District: Jindřichův Hradec
- First mentioned: 1190

Area
  - Total: 24.77 km^{2} (9.56 sq mi)
- Elevation: 514 m (1,686 ft)

Population (2026-01-01)
  - Total: 512
  - Density: 20.7/km^{2} (53.5/sq mi)
- Time zone: UTC+1 (CET)
  - Summer (DST): UTC+2 (CEST)
- Postal codes: 378 71, 378 81, 380 01
- Website: www.starehobzi.cz

Staré Hobzí is a municipality and village in Jindřichův Hradec District in the South Bohemian Region of the Czech Republic. It has about 500 inhabitants.

Staré Hobzí lies approximately 37 kilometres (23 mi) south-east of Jindřichův Hradec, 72 km (45 mi) east of České Budějovice, and 142 km (88 mi) south-east of Prague.

== Administrative division ==
Staré Hobzí consists of five municipal parts (in brackets population according to the 2021 census):

- Staré Hobzí (382)
- Janov (11)
- Nové Dvory (36)
- Nové Hobzí (8)
- Vnorovice (70)

== Demographics ==
Historical population
Year	Pop.	±%
1869	1,199	—
1880	1,278	+6.6%
1890	1,267	−0.9%
1900	1,188	−6.2%
1910	1,128	−5.1%
1921	1,120	−0.7%
1930	1,119	−0.1%
1950	826	−26.2%
1961	882	+6.8%
1970	755	−14.4%
1980	684	−9.4%
1991	620	−9.4%
2001	570	−8.1%
2011	520	−8.8%
2021	507	−2.5%
Source: Censuses
