= Karina Yaniv =

Israeli scientist

Karina Yaniv (Hebrew: קרינה יניב) is an Israeli scientist who is best known for her contributions to the field of vascular development. She is a professor of Vascular Disease in the Department of Biological Regulation at the Weizman Institute of science, Rehovot, Israel. She has three kids: Yotam Yaniv, Nitay Yaniv, and Eylon Yaniv, and since 2023 is married to another Weizmann Institute of Science biologist, Eldad Tzahor.

== Research ==
Yaniv investigates the mechanisms that regulate blood and lymphatic vessel formation during embryonic development and in disease. She utilizes zebrafish embryos to study the mechanisms controlling the lineage specification of lymphatic endothelial cells and the development of lymphatic vessels.

A recent achievement was the discovery of a new niche of specialized progenitors which gives rise to the lymphatic system. They identified the first "lymphatic-inducing" signal, capable of inducing lymphatic differentiation of human embryonic stem cells. Her laboratory generated for the first time human lymphatic endothelial cells in culture, which opens the way for other laboratories to understand the basic determinants and behavioral properties of these cells.

Research in Yaniv's laboratory also focuses on lymphatic vessels in the heart: how do they form and what is their possible role in heart diseases. Other projects focus on the mechanisms that control the formation of lymphatic vessels induced by tumors, since the lymphatic system is the key route for dissemination of metastatic cells.

== Awards and honours ==
In 2016, Yaniv was Awarded a LE&RN Wendy Chaite Leadership Award. She received grants from the Horizon 2020 program, including €2m for her LymphMap project. Other awards and honors include: European Research Council grant (2014–2019), Israel Cancer Research Foundation Career Development Award (2012), Werner-Risau-Prize for outstanding research in vascular biology (2007), EMBO postdoctoral fellowship (2005–2007), Susan G. Komen Young Investigator Scholarship from the Lymphatic Research Foundation, now LE&RN (2006). She is a member of the European Vascular Biology Organization (EVBO), the North American Vascular Biology Organization (NAVBO), and the European Molecular Biology Organization (EMBO).

== Selected publications ==
- Das, Rudra Nayan; Yaniv, Karina (2020-02-10). "Discovering New Progenitor Cell Populations through Lineage Tracing and In Vivo Imaging". Cold Spring Harbor Perspectives in Biology. 12 (10) a035618. doi:10.1101/cshperspect.a035618. ISSN 1943-0264. PMC 7528852. PMID 32041709.
- Nicenboim, J.; Malkinson, G.; Lupo, T.; Asaf, L.; Sela, Y.; Mayseless, O.; Gibbs-Bar, L.; Senderovich, N.; Hashimshony, T.; Shin, M.; Jerafi-Vider, A. (2015). "Lymphatic vessels arise from specialized angioblasts within a venous niche". Nature. 522 (7554): 56–61. Bibcode:2015Natur.522...56N. doi:10.1038/nature14425. ISSN 0028-0836. PMID 25992545. S2CID 4402229.
- Yaniv, Karina; Isogai, Sumio; Castranova, Daniel; Dye, Louis; Hitomi, Jiro; Weinstein, Brant M. (2006). "Live imaging of lymphatic development in the zebrafish". Nature Medicine. 12 (6): 711–716. doi:10.1038/nm1427. ISSN 1546-170X. PMID 16732279. S2CID 24639075.
