= Janov (Rychnov nad Kněžnou District) =

- Municipality
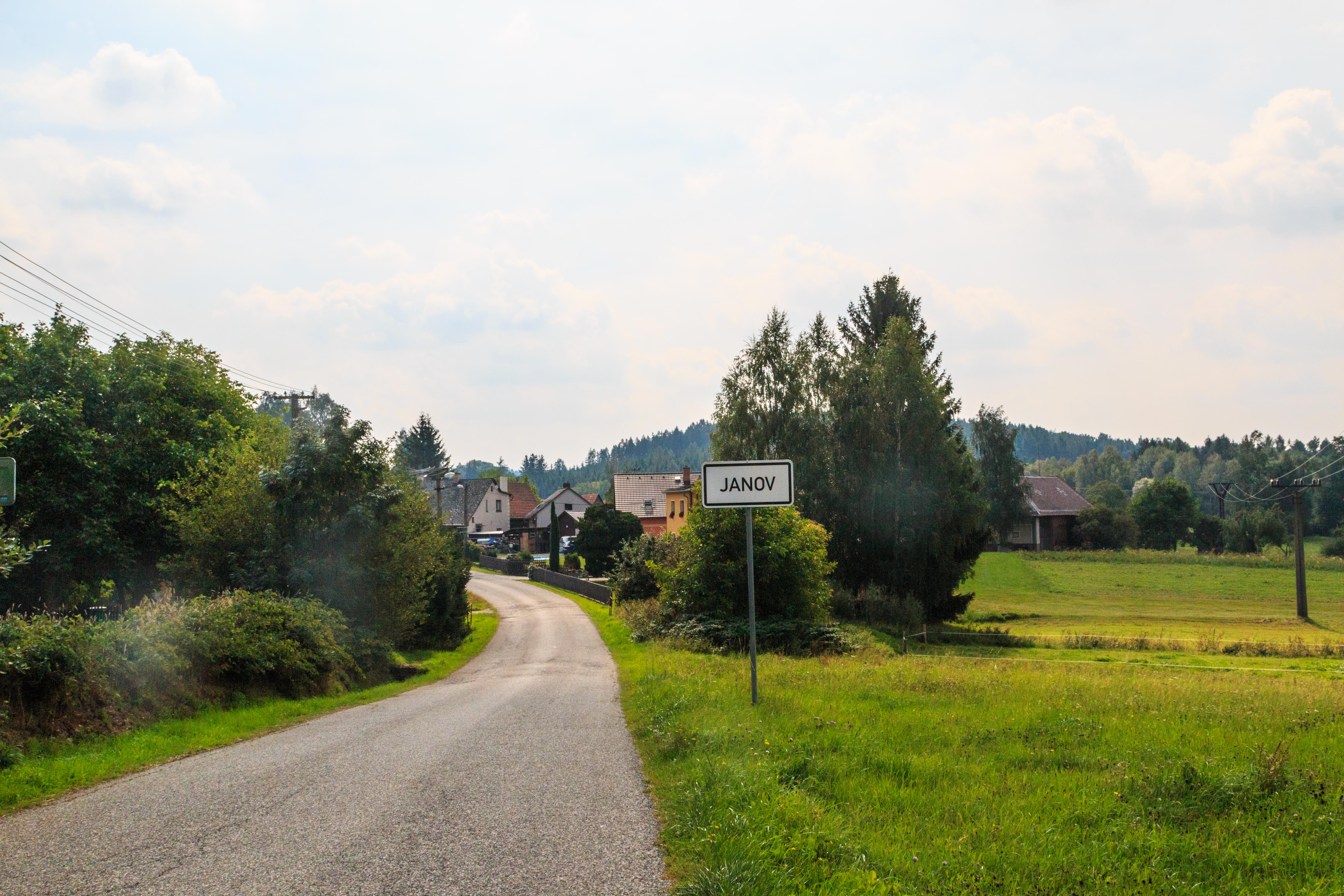
- Northern entrance to Janov

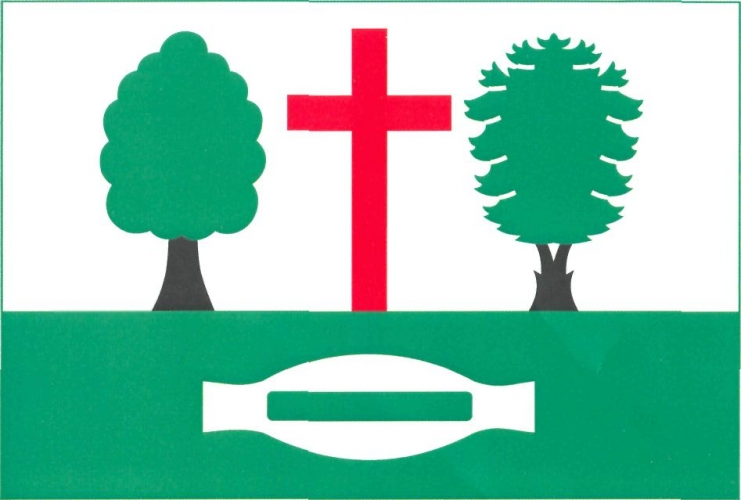
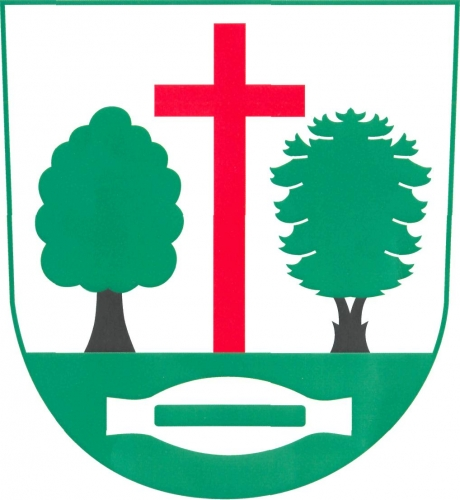
- Flag Coat of arms

- Location in the Czech Republic
- Coordinates: 50°19′56″N 16°15′7″E
- Country: Czech Republic
- Region: Hradec Králové
- District: Rychnov nad Kněžnou
- First mentioned: 1544

Area
  - Total: 3.41 km^{2} (1.32 sq mi)
- Elevation: 517 m (1,696 ft)

Population (2026-01-01)
  - Total: 117
  - Density: 34.3/km^{2} (88.9/sq mi)
- Time zone: UTC+1 (CET)
  - Summer (DST): UTC+2 (CEST)
- Postal code: 518 01
- Website: www.janovobec.cz

Janov is a municipality and village in Rychnov nad Kněžnou District in the Hradec Králové Region of the Czech Republic. It has about 100 inhabitants.

== Administrative division ==
Janov consists of two municipal parts (in brackets population according to the 2021 census):

- Janov (62)
- Tis (36)

== Demographics ==
Historical population
Year	Pop.	±%
1869	544	—
1880	495	−9.0%
1890	509	+2.8%
1900	440	−13.6%
1910	458	+4.1%
1921	425	−7.2%
1930	374	−12.0%
1950	242	−35.3%
1961	210	−13.2%
1970	184	−12.4%
1980	151	−17.9%
1991	113	−25.2%
2001	109	−3.5%
2011	108	−0.9%
2021	98	−9.3%
Source: Censuses
