= Janov, Prešov District =

Village and municipality in Prešov District in Slovakia

Janov
- Municipality
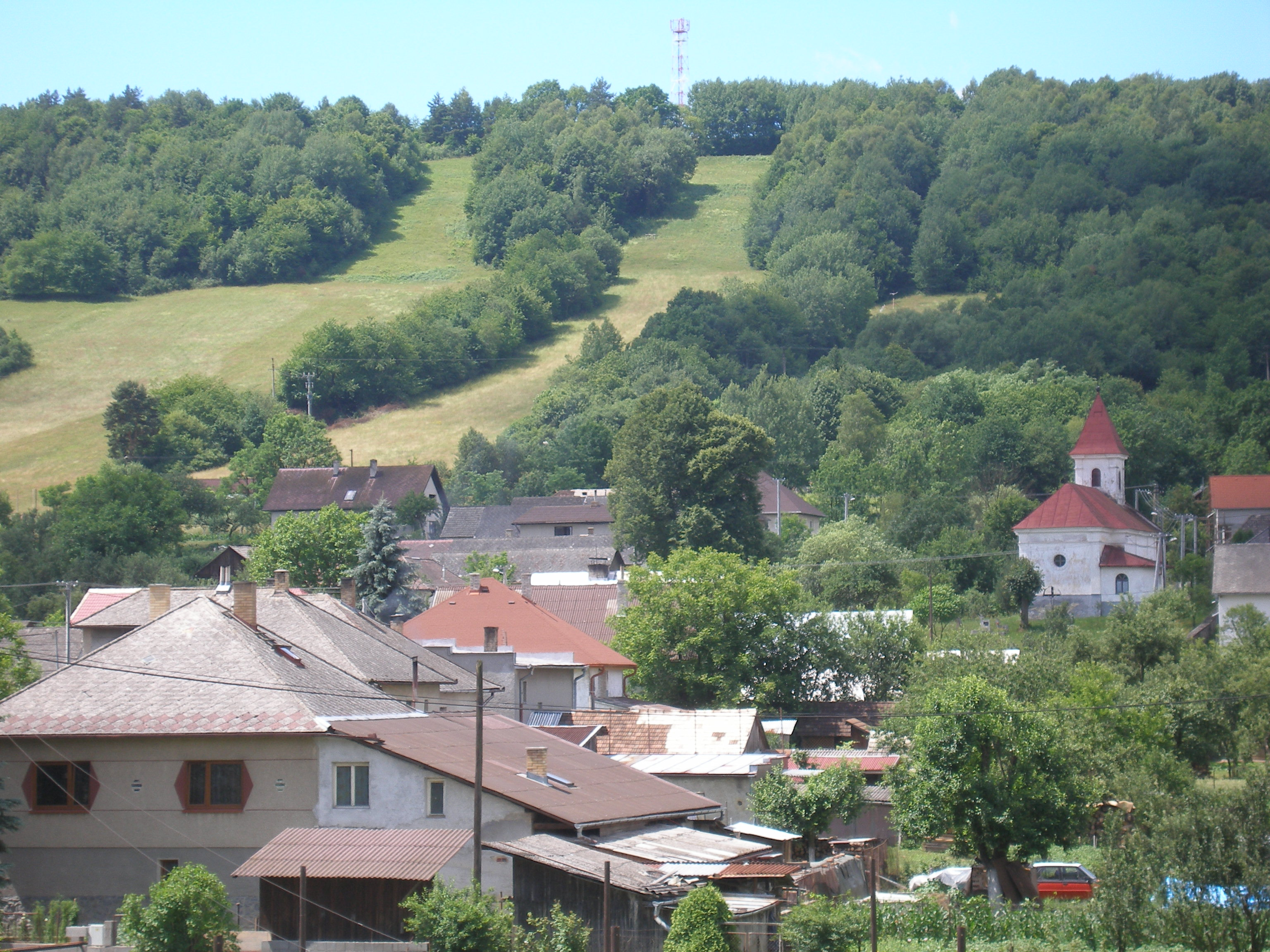

- Flag

- Location of Janov in the Prešov Region Location of Janov in Slovakia
- Coordinates: 48.93°N 21.18°E
- Country: Slovakia
- Region: Prešov Region
- District: Prešov District
- First mentioned: 1341

Area
  - Total: 4.71 km^{2} (1.82 sq mi)
- Elevation: 294 m (965 ft)

Population (2025)
  - Total: 309
- Time zone: UTC+1 (CET)
  - Summer (DST): UTC+2 (CEST)
- Postal code: 824 2
- Area code: +421 51
- Vehicle registration plate (until 2022): PO
- Website: www.obecjanov.sk

Janov (Rusyn: Янов) is a village and municipality in Prešov District in the Prešov Region of eastern Slovakia.

== History ==
In historical records the village was first mentioned in 1341.

== Geography ==
The municipality lies at an altitude of 294 metres (965 ft) and covers an area of 4.71 km^{2} (1.82 sq mi) (2025).

== Population ==
Population statistic (10 years)
Year	1995	2005	2015	2025
Count	253	291	325	309
Difference		+15.01%	+11.68%	−4.92%

Population statistic
Year	2024	2025
Count	309	309
Difference		+0%

It has a population of 309 people (31 December 2025).

=== Ethnicity ===
Census 2021 (1+ %)
Ethnicity	Number	Fraction
Slovak	319	97.55%
Romani	11	3.36%
Not found out	7	2.14%
Total	327	

In year 2021 was 327 people by ethnicity 319 as Slovak, 11 as Romani, 7 as Not found out, 1 as Czech, 1 as Irish and 1 as Other.

Note on population: The difference values of population numbers in the table "Population statistic" and in the sections "Ethnicity" & "Religion" is caused by the use of various statistical methods.

=== Religion ===
Census 2021 (1+ %)
Religion	Number	Fraction
Roman Catholic Church	153	46.79%
Evangelical Church	116	35.47%
Greek Catholic Church	35	10.7%
None	12	3.67%
Jehovah's Witnesses	6	1.83%
Not found out	4	1.22%
Total	327	

In year 2021 was 327 people by religion 153 from Roman Catholic Church, 116 from Evangelical Church, 35 from Greek Catholic Church, 12 from None, 6 from Jehovah's Witnesses, 4 from Not found out and 1 from Other and not ascertained christian church.

== Genealogical resources ==
The records for genealogical research are available at the state archive "Statny Archiv in Presov, Slovakia"

- Roman Catholic church records (births/marriages/deaths): 1720–1895 (parish B)
- Greek Catholic church records (births/marriages/deaths): 1812–1904 (parish B)
- Lutheran church records (births/marriages/deaths): 1720–1895 (parish B)

== See also ==
- List of municipalities and towns in Slovakia
