= Shmuel Yaniv =

Israeli rabbi

Rabbi Shmuel Yaniv שמואל יניב

Personal life
- Born: Ramat Gan, Israel

Religious life
- Religion: Judaism
- Yeshiva: Midrashiat Noam

Rabbi Shmuel Yaniv (Hebrew: שמואל יניב) is one of the pioneers of Bible code research. He has authored over twenty books in Hebrew. He studied for two years under Rabbi Zvi Yehuda Hacohen Kook in the Merkaz Harav Yeshiva in Jerusalem. During the 1970s he taught in the Midrashiat Noam school, and later taught for many years in Ulpanat Tzfira girls' school.

== Books ==
- Secrets in the Torah (Tze'fonot ba-Torah) - nine parts.
- Words of the Sages and their Secrets (Divrei chachamim ve-tze'fonoteikhem)- three parts.
- The Doctrine of Jewish Law (Torat ha-mishpat ha-Ivri)
- Secrets of the Soul (Tze'fonot ha-nefesh)
- Secrets of Love (Tze'fonot ha-ahavah)
- Love is Hidden Within (Tocho tza'fun ahavah)
- The Difference is Subtle (Ha-hevdel hu dak)
- Revelation (Ha-tigalut)
- To Replace the Bitter with Humor (Le-hamer ha-mar ba-humor)
