= Chełmża Lake =

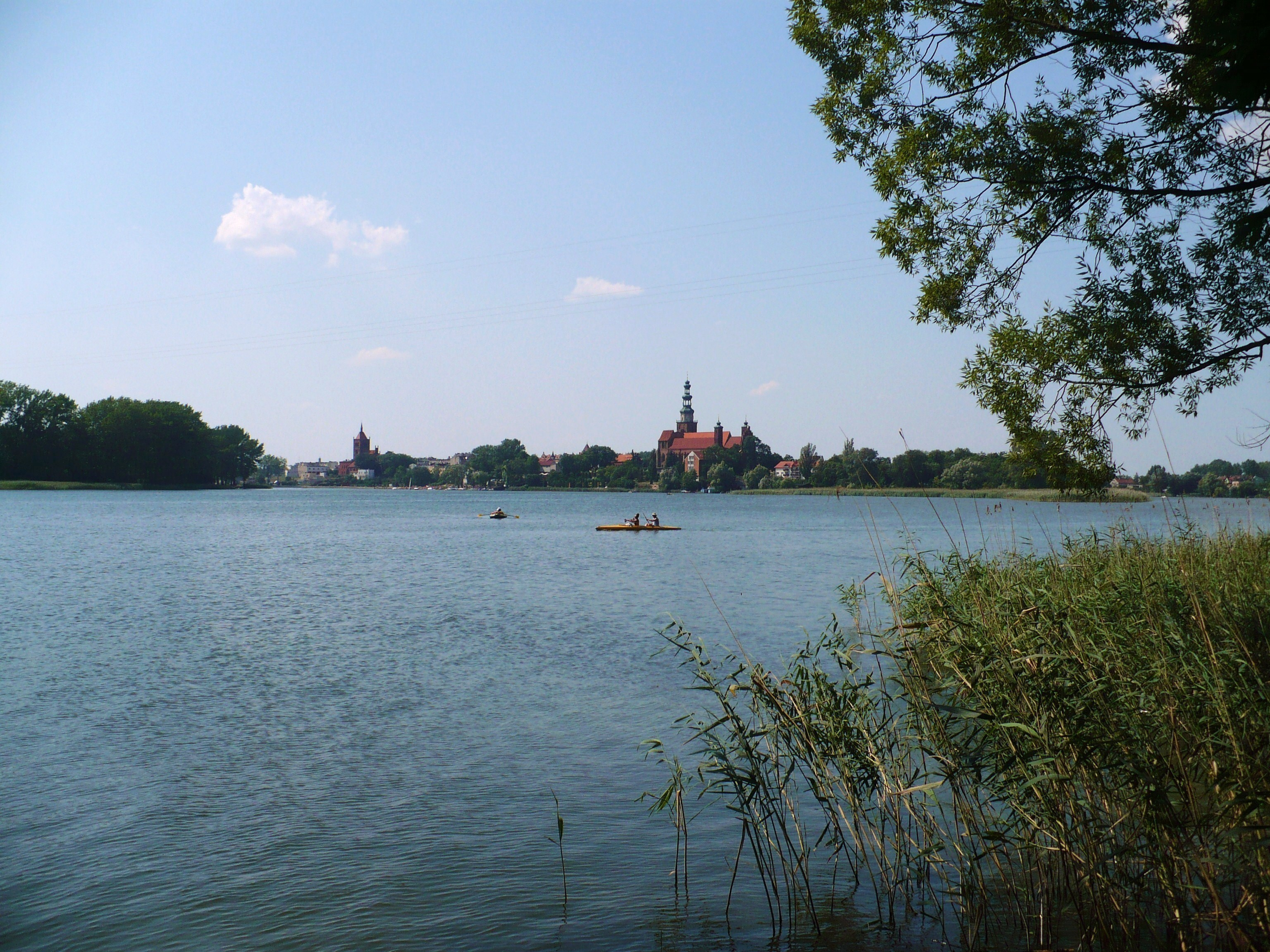
- The lake with the panorama of the town of Chełmża in the background

- Location within Poland Location within Kuyavian-Pomeranian Voivodeship
- Location: Poland, Chełmża, Toruń County, Kuyavian-Pomeranian Voivodeship, Poland
- Coordinates: 53°10′35.73″N 18°38′35.51″E
- Type: ribbon lake
- Max. length: 6 km (3.7 mi)
- Max. width: 0.5 km (0.31 mi)
- Surface area: 2.7 km^{2} (1.0 sq mi)
- Max. depth: 27 m (89 ft)
- Settlements: Chełmża, Mirakowo, Pluskowęsy, Strużal, Zalesie

Chełmża Lake (Polish: Jezioro Chełmżyńskie) is a lake in north-central Poland, located near the town of Chełmża, Toruń County, Kuyavian-Pomeranian Voivodeship.

The lake is up to 6 km long, has a width up to 0,5 km, is up to 27 m deep, and has an area of 2,7 km^{2}.
