= Svatoslav =

Svatoslav may refer to:

== Places in the Czech Republic ==
- Svatoslav (Brno-Country District), a municipality and village in the South Moravian Region
- Svatoslav (Třebíč District), a municipality and village in the Vysočina Region
- Svatoslav, a village and part of Luka nad Jihlavou in the Vysočina Region

== People ==
- Svatoslav (given name), Czech given name

== See also ==
- Sviatoslav
