= Tideman von Allen =

Prussian patrician (1430-1499)

Tideman von Allen (19 August 1430 – 8 June 1499) was a councillor and mayor in Toruń during the 15th century. Toruń, also known as Thorn, was in the Prussian Confederation from 1440 and became part of Royal Prussia, a Polish province, from 1466. Allen was a distinguished patrician, and he was twice appointed as a royal burgrave.

== Biography ==
Tideman von Allen was the son of Tilman von Allen and Elisabeth Rusop. He was born 19 August 1430 in Toruń. The von Allens came from Westphalia. They were a merchant family and soon earned a large fortune and significance in Toruń, a city that is now part of Poland. Some of the family has distinguished roles in Toruń, for example, Herman von Allen, a juror in 1307, along with Heinrich von Allen in 1320. Tideman von Allen married Kryztyna Watzenrode, the daughter of Lucas Watzenrode, the elder, on 30 January 1459 in Toruń.

Tidemann von Allen was a staunch opponent of the Teutonic Knights, like his father-in-law, Lucas Watzenrode the elder. In 1462, Allen, as commander of the Toruń army, captured Świecie Castle and served as its commander for a time. In 1473, the year his nephew-in-law, Nicolaus Copernicus, was born, Tidemann von Allen was the ruling mayor of the city. He died on 8 June 1499 in Toruń.

== Family ==
He married Kryztyna Watzenrode, the daughter of Lucas Watzenrode, the elder and Katarzyna Rusop (In some sources named Gente Modlibóg Rüdiger). The couple had four children.

- Christina, born on 3 March 1466, married the influential merchant Heinrich Krüger.
- Lucas, born on 24 June 1467, became a starost in Rogóźno.
- Barbara, born on 5 March 1475, married the mayor Johan von Beutel.
- Cordula, born on 21 April 1480, married the ratsherr Reinhold Feldstedt.
