= Svetislav =

Svetislav (Serbian: Светислав) is a Serbian masculine given name of Slavic origin. It may refer to:

- Svetislav Basara (born 1953), Serbian writer
- Svetislav Glišović (1913–1988), Serbian football player and manager
- Svetislav Goncić (born 1960), Serbian actor
- Svetislav Jovanović (1861–1933), Serbian painter
- Svetislav Mandić (1921–2003), Serbian historian, fresco conserver, poet and painter
- Svetislav Milosavljević (1882–1960), Yugoslav military architect and public officer
- Svetislav Perduv (born 1959), retired football player and manager
- Svetislav Pešić (born 1949), former Serbian professional basketball player and active basketball coach
- Svetislav Stančić (1895–1970), Croatian pianist and music pedagogue
- Svetislav Valjarević (1911–1996), Serbian football player

== See also ==
- Sviatoslav
- Svatoslav (disambiguation)
- Świętosław (disambiguation)
- Svetoslav
