= Emil Czarliński =

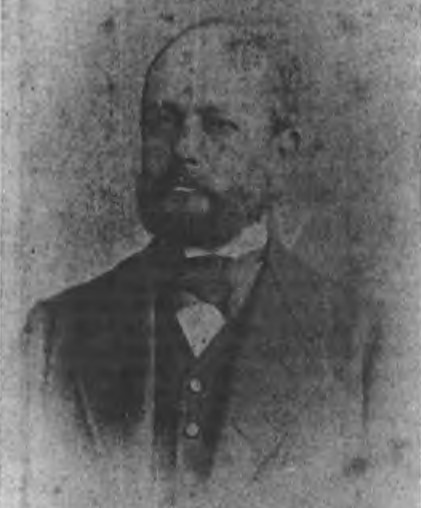

Member of the Reichstag of the North German Confederation for Wejherowo and Kartuzy (Danzig 4)
- In office 12 February 1867 – 3 March 1871
- Preceded by: Constituency established
- Succeeded by: Leon Rybiński

Member of the Prussian House of Representatives
- In office: 1867–1870; 1873–1879

Personal details
- Born: Emil Schedlin-Czarliński; 5 May 1833; Chwarzno, Kingdom of Prussia
- Died: 21 March 1913; Chełmno, Kingdom of Prussia, German Empire
- Political party: Polish Party

Emil Schedlin-Czarliński (5 May 1833 – 21 March 1913) was a Polish landowner, January Uprising participant, and a member of the Reichstag of the North German Confederation.

== Biography ==
=== Early life ===
Czarliński was born in Chwarzno as the eldest son of Felicjan Czarliński. He attended Gymnasiums in Konitz and Chełmno. While still a Gymnasium student, he participated in the Greater Poland Uprising of 1848, along with his father and his younger brother, Leon.

Having passed his Abitur in 1853, he went on to study law at the University of Breslau. While there, he was an active member of the Literary-Slavic Society, a group dedicated to research and cultivation of Slavic languages and literature. He finished his degree in Berlin in 1858, worked as a law clerk in Samter for two years, and then took his law apprenticeship in Berlin.

Czarliński was elected Landrat of Neustadt District in 1860, but was not confirmed for the office. With financial assistance from his father, Czarliński purchased the estate of Brąchnówko in 1862, where he would fund a construction of a mansion in 1866.

=== January Uprising ===
When the January Uprising broke out in 1863, Czarliński, along with his father and brothers, took up arms, forming the core of insurrectionary leadership in West Prussia. In the second half of March 1864, he joined a short lived expedition led by Edmund Callier, for which he served as a recruiter. This led to his arrest by Prussian authorities on 5 April.

Initially placed at a detention center in Kulm, he was accused of treason, and transferred to Moabit prison in Berlin, his acts punishable by death. His estate in Brąchnówko was sequestered on 28 May. He was tried in a mass trial of 149 Polish insurrectionists before the Kammergericht, which began on 7 August in Berlin. The verdict for the first part of the case was announced on 23 December 1864, with Czarliński's acquital leading to his release from prison.

=== Later activity ===
In 1865, Emil founded the Agricultural-Industrial Society of Toruń, and, along with Leon Czarliński, the Agricultural Society of Chełmża. He was elected to the Reichstag of the North German Confederation in 1867 as a deputy for Neustadt and Karthaus. He was a member of the Polish Parliamentary Group. In the Reichstag, he was an advocate of Polish schools in West Prussia. He opposed the accession of former Polish territories to the North German Confederation, and voted against the proposed constitution.

Czarliński was also elected to the Prussian House of Representatives in 1867, and remained a member until 1870, there too a member of the Polish Parliamentary Group. In 1969, Emil and Leon founded the Society for Moral Interests of Polish People Under Prussian Rule in Toruń. The organization's stated goal was cultivation of Polish culture and education and advocating for the equality of Polish people in all of Prussia.

Czarliński was once again elected to the House of Representatives in 1873. At the height of Kulturkampf, he was a staunch defender of the Catholic Church, which led to his close cooperation with the Centre Party, which represented the interests of German Catholics. Although his term ended in 1879, he retired from parliamentary activity in 1877.

Despite his retirement, Czarliński remained an active protest organizer. He arranged catholic rallies in 1981 in Toruń, and in 1984 in Poznań. He died in Chełmno on 21 March 1913 at the age of 80.

== Family ==
Coat of arms of the Czarliński family

The Czarlińscy were a Polish aristocratic family tracing its roots to Czarlin, with the earliest mentions dating back to the 14th century. Despite their long history, the family has never held any high posts in the Kingdom of Poland or Grand Duchy of Lithuania.

Emil Czarliński was the son of Felicjan Czarliński, then owner of the estate of Chwarzno, and Emilia Czarlińska née Rokicka. He had four younger brothers – Leon, Eugeniusz, Maksymilian and Wiktor – all of them participants in the January Uprising. Leon Czarliński was, like his brother, a representative to the Prussian House of Representatives, and later to the Reichstag of the German Empire, for the Polish Party.

Czarliński married Hortensja Donimirska, the daughter of Teodor Donimirski, in 1860. The pair had eight children: Teodor, Felicjan, Wincenty, Emilia, Maria, Helena, Józefa and Zofia.
