= Świętosław (disambiguation) =

Świętosław is a Slavic name used in Poland.

Świętosław may also refer to:

- Świętosław, Golub-Dobrzyń County in Kuyavian-Pomeranian Voivodeship (north-central Poland)
- Świętosław, Toruń County in Kuyavian-Pomeranian Voivodeship (north-central Poland)
- Świętosław, West Pomeranian Voivodeship (north-west Poland)
- Świętosław, Włocławek County in Kuyavian-Pomeranian Voivodeship (north-central Poland)

== See also ==
- Sviatoslav, East Slavic cognate
- Świętosława, a Polish princess
