= Basilier =

Basilier is a surname. Notable people with the surname include:

- Ida Basilier-Magelssen (1846–1928), Finnish soprano
- Regina Basilier (1572–1631), German-born Swedish merchant and moneylender
