= Svatoslav (given name) =

Svatoslav is a Czech masculine given name. It originates from the Slavic roots svet ('strong') and sláva ('glory'). The feminine counterpart is Svatoslava. Cognates include Svetoslav, Sviatoslav and Svetislav. Notable people with the name include:

- Svatoslav Galík (1938–2019), Czech orienteering competitor
- Svatoslav Štěpánek (1911–1938), Czech serial killer
- Svatoslav Ton (born 1978), Czech high jumper
