= Fieldstone church =

Church building made of field stones

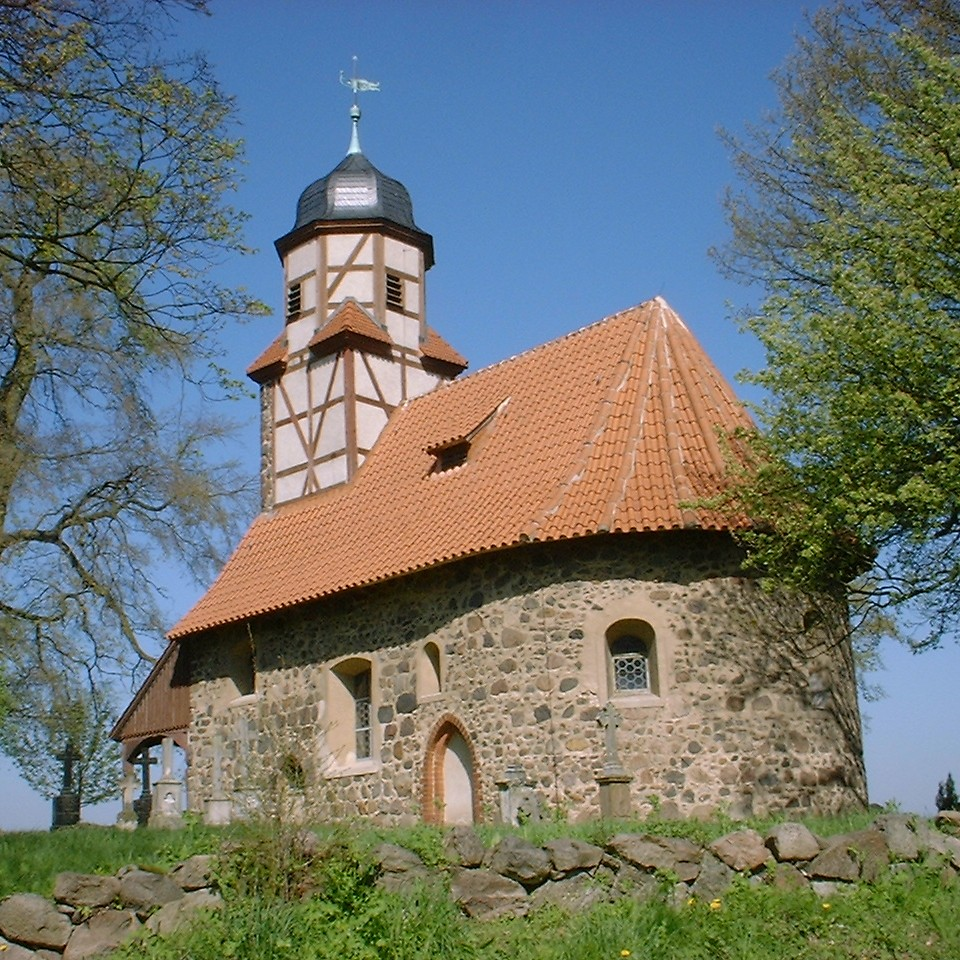
Fieldstone church at Zixdorf in the Fläming, Germany, 13th and 15th century

A fieldstone church (German: Feldsteinkirche) is a type of church, built using fieldstone of glacial erratics and glacial rubble. Such cathedrals and monasteries occur mostly in areas where the ice ages have deposited such rock material on the one hand, and where on the other hand there is little or no access to natural rock for quarrying and fashioning. In Europe, the primary areas with fieldstone churches are Saxony-Anhalt, Schleswig-Holstein, Mecklenburg-Vorpommern and Brandenburg (including Berlin) in Germany, as well as Poland, Finland, parts of Scandinavia and the Baltic states. The stones used are often granite, gneiss or quartzite; they can be used both hewn and unshaped. Since some of the churches are painted, the stones are not always visible. Especially in later examples, the fieldstones are often combined with other materials, such as brick or half-timbered parts.

Many fieldstone churches are in the Romanesque tradition, and others are Gothic or in somewhat later architectural styles. The earliest examples date to the 11th century (in some regions later, depending on the date of Christianisation and of the German eastward expansion). Many early examples in Holstein are associated with the activities of St. Vicelinus and are thus known as Vizellinskirchen (Vicellinus churches); they often have round towers. Some of the earliest churches in Denmark (especially Bornholm) are fieldstone-built round churches. The flourish of the development of fieldstone churches was around the end of the 12th century, after which they became less common due to the increasing popularity of brick-built architecture (see Brick Romanesque and Brick Gothic). Their construction mostly ceased at the end of the 16th century. In the context of architectural revival styles, especially of Neo-Romanesque, further fieldstone churches were erected in the late 19th and early 20th centuries.

== Gallery ==
Examples of fieldstone churches

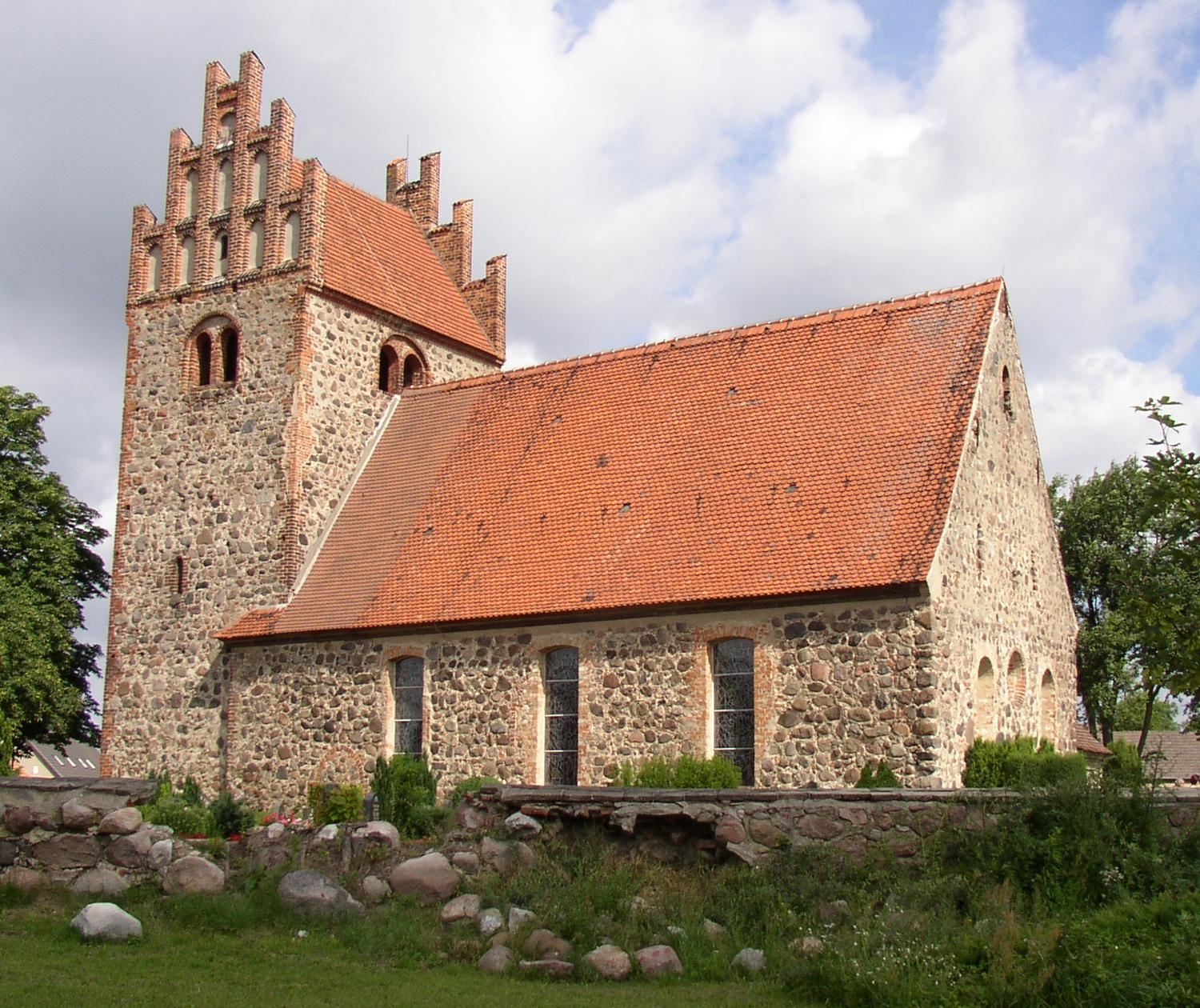
Herzberg, Germany, 13th century

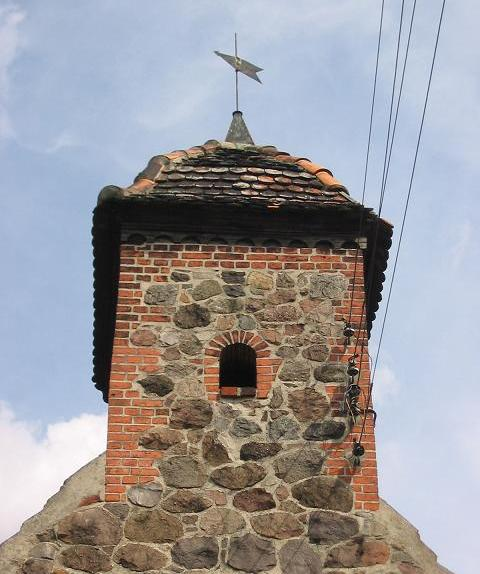
Fieldstone and brick combination on spire in Klein Marzehns, Germany, Late Medieval

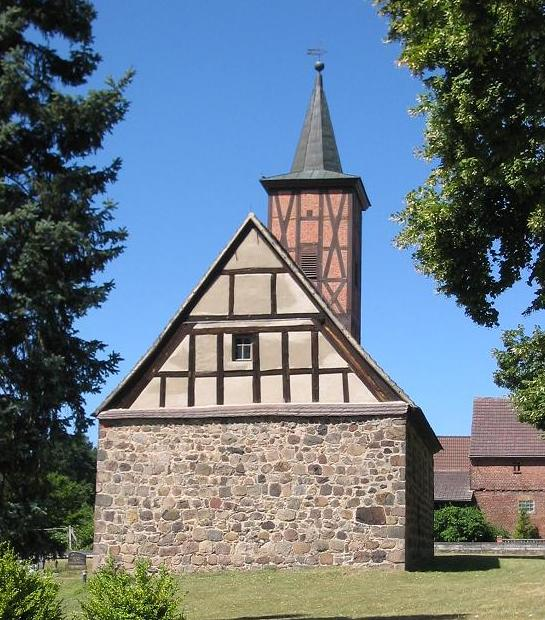
Fieldstone, brick and half-timbered combination at Kranepuhl, Germany, early 13th century

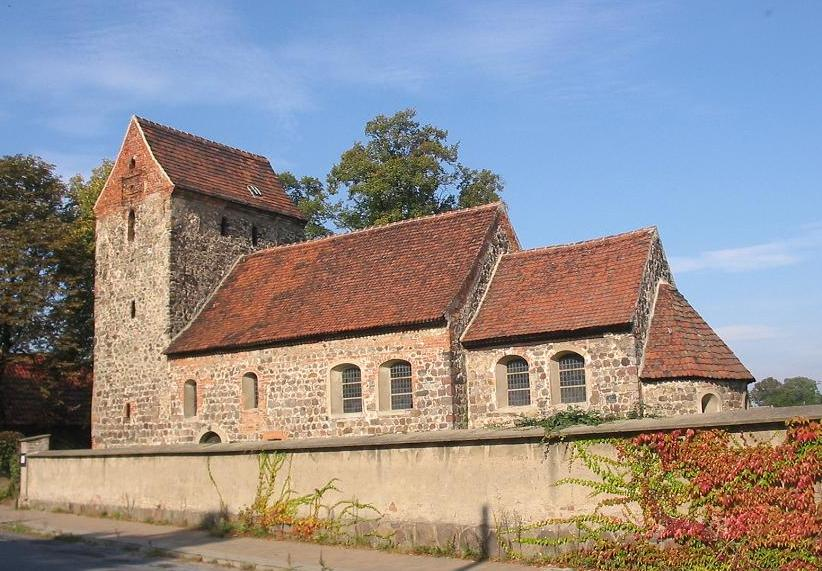
Lubnitz, Germany, early 13th century

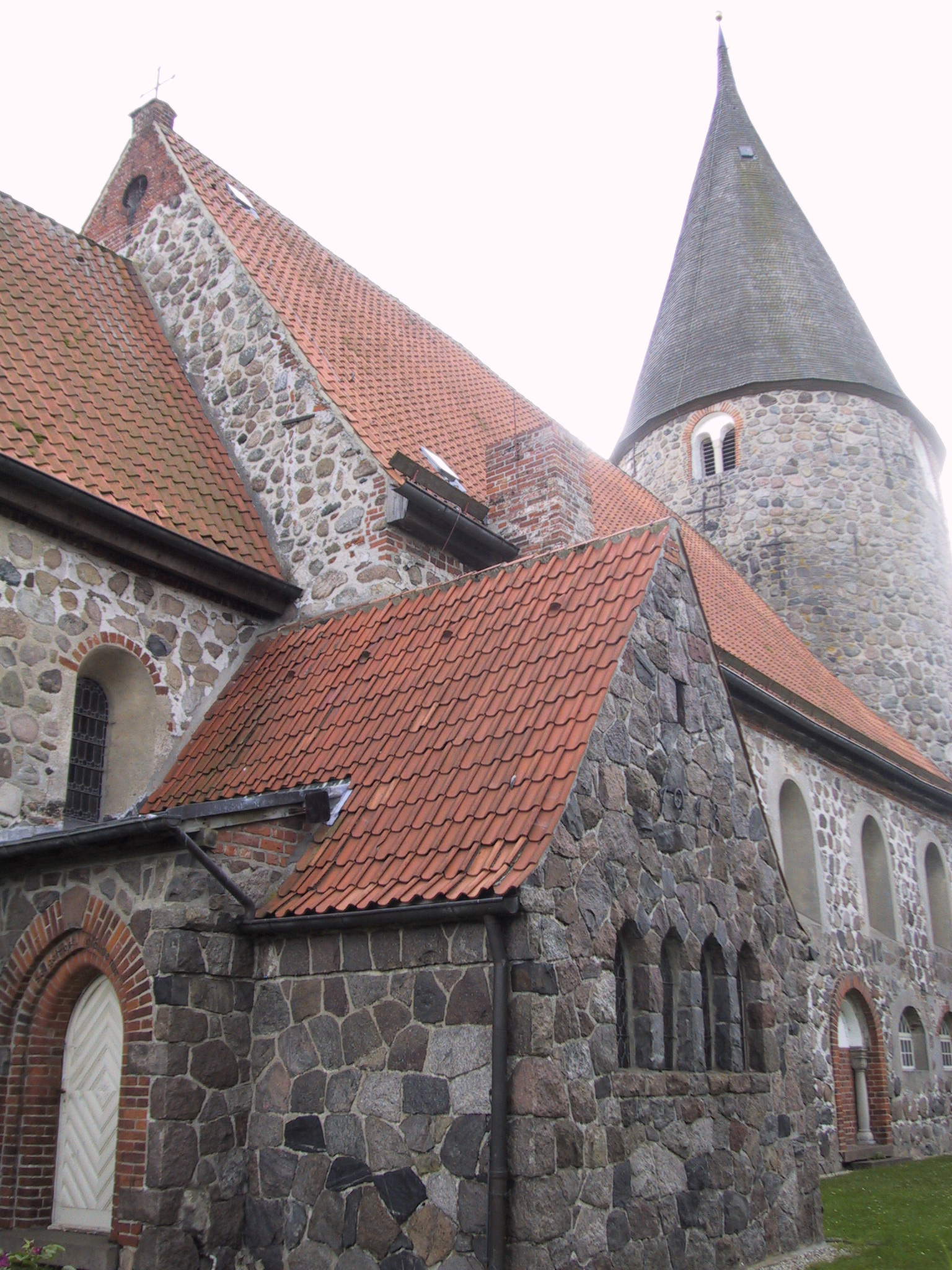
Ratekau, Germany, St. Vicellinus, 1156

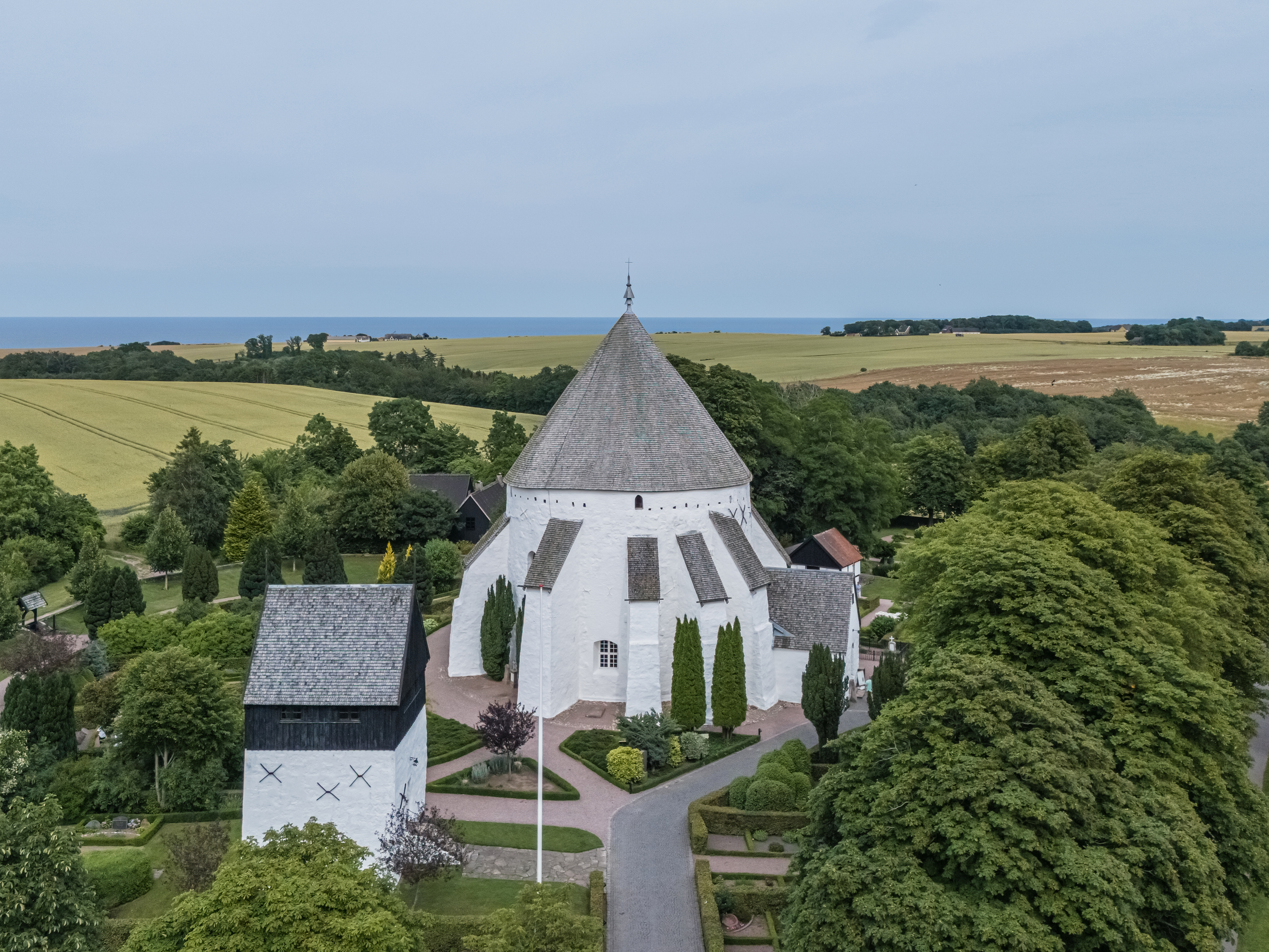
Østerlarskirke, Allinge-Gudhjem on Bornholm, Denmark, 11th century

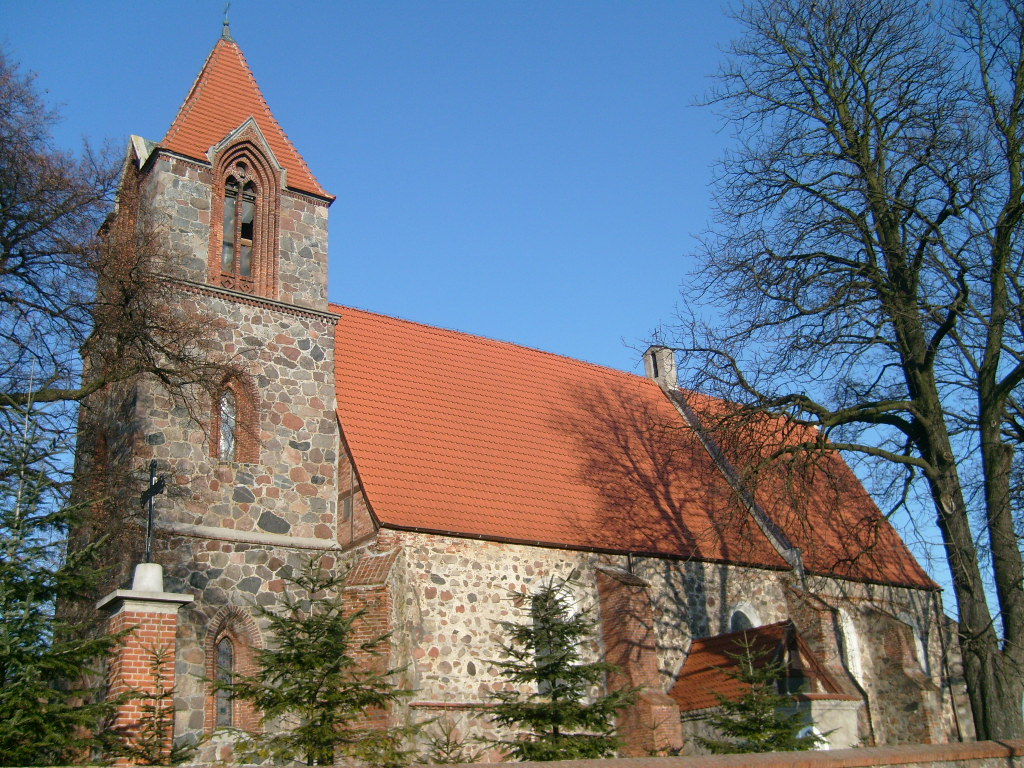
Dźwierzno, Poland, 15th century

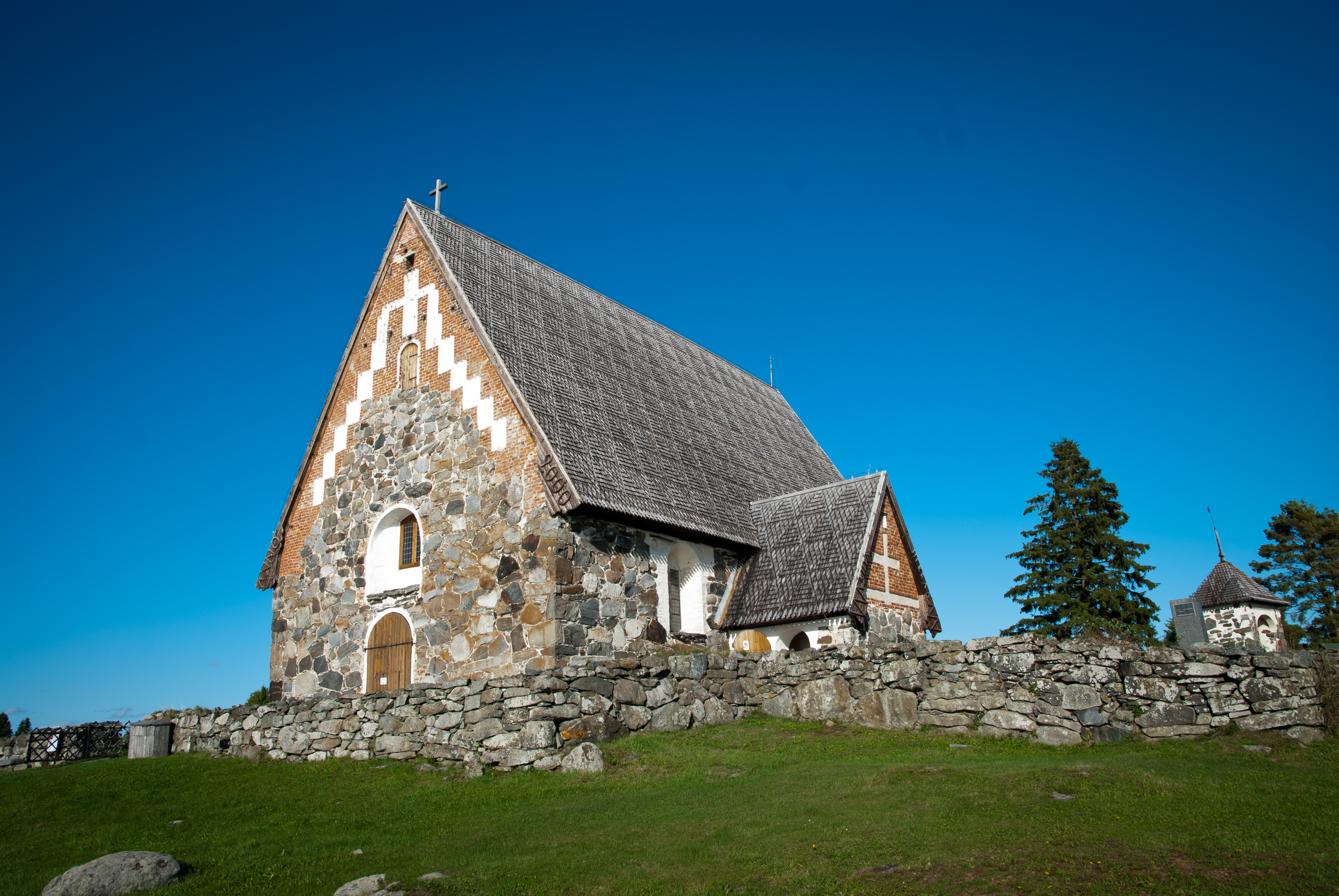
St. Olaf's Church, Sastamala, Finland, 1510

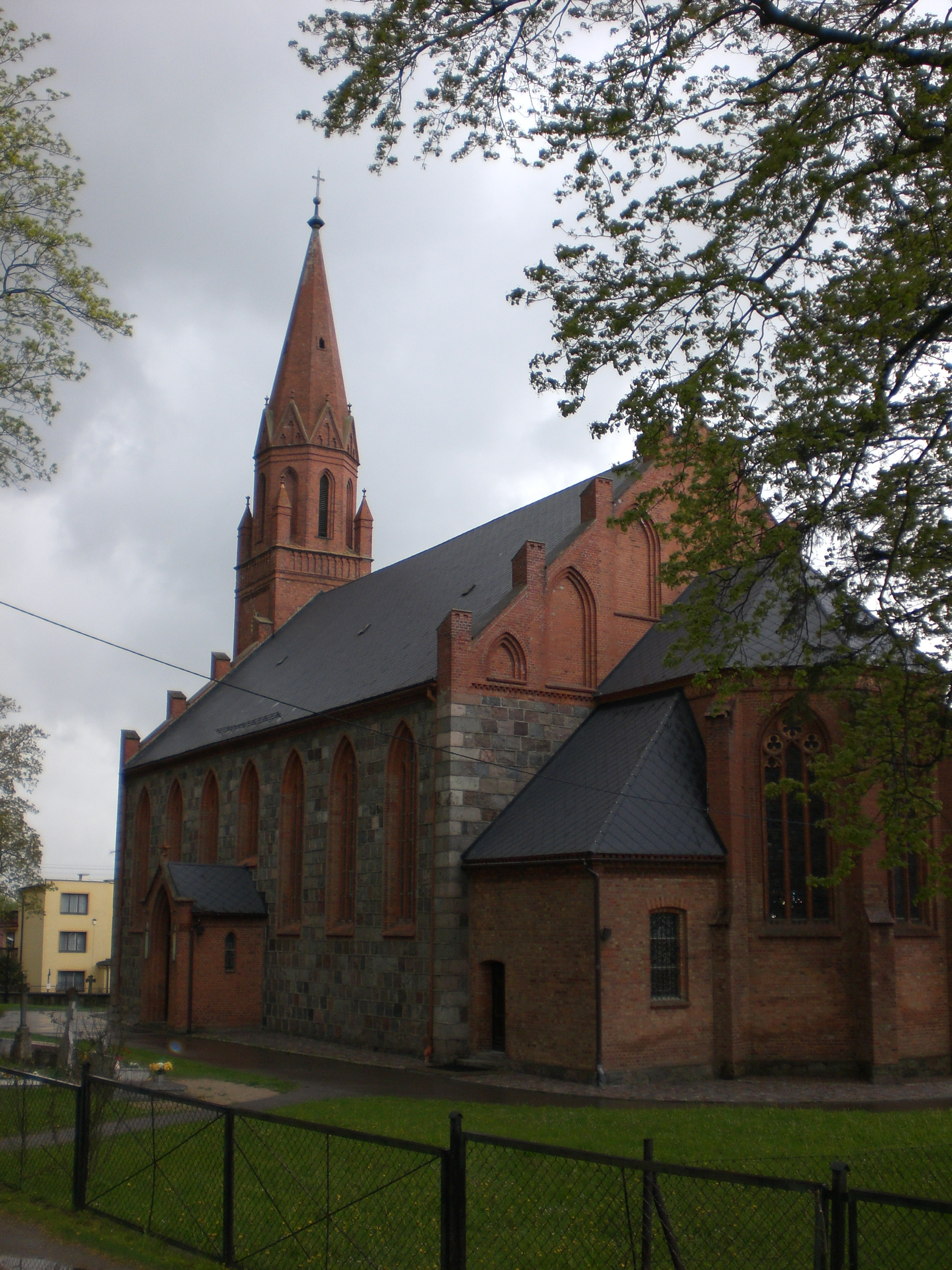
Church in Przodkowo, Kashubia, 19th century

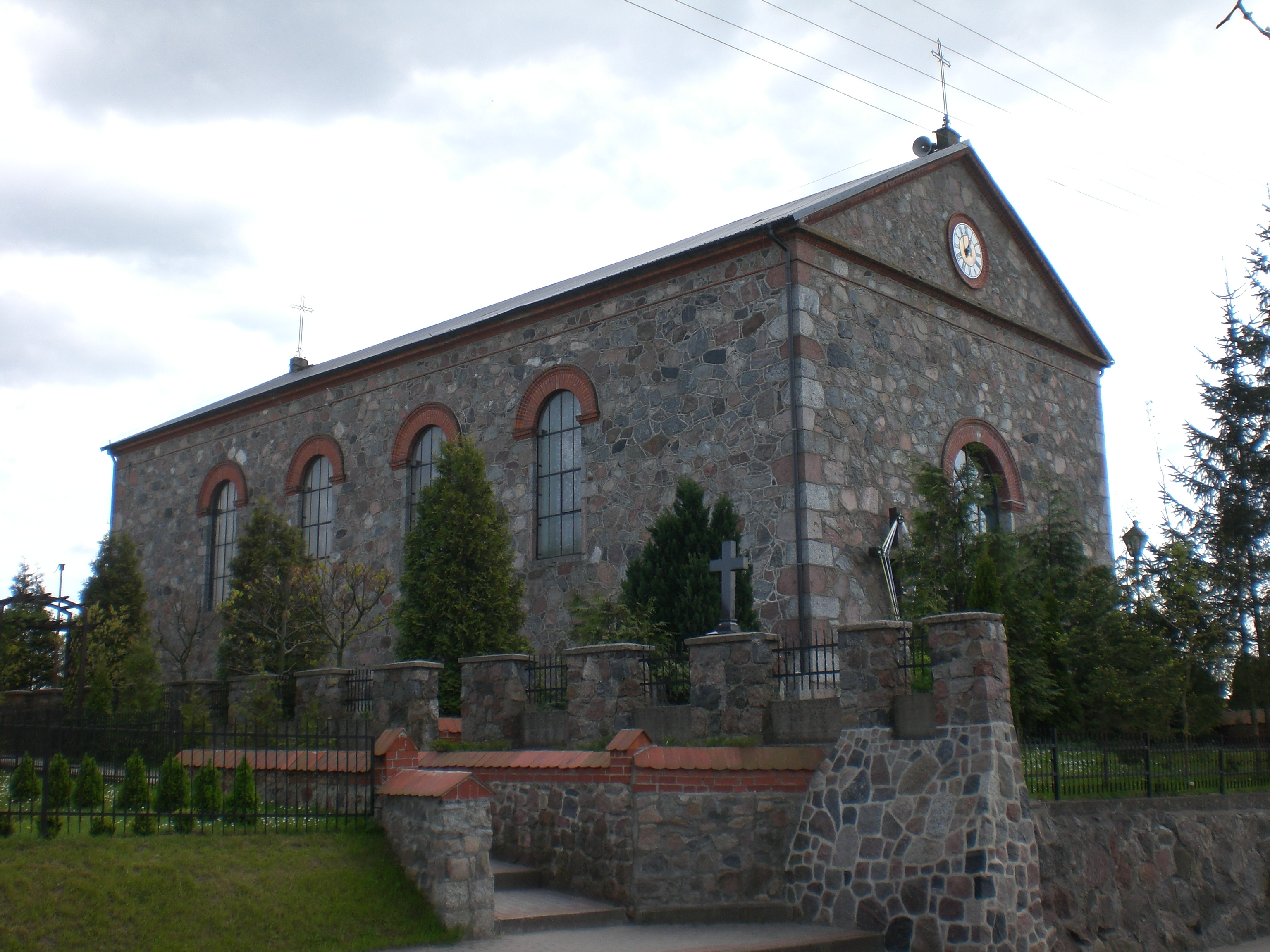
Church in Rozłazino, Pomeranian Voivodeship, Kashubia, 19th century

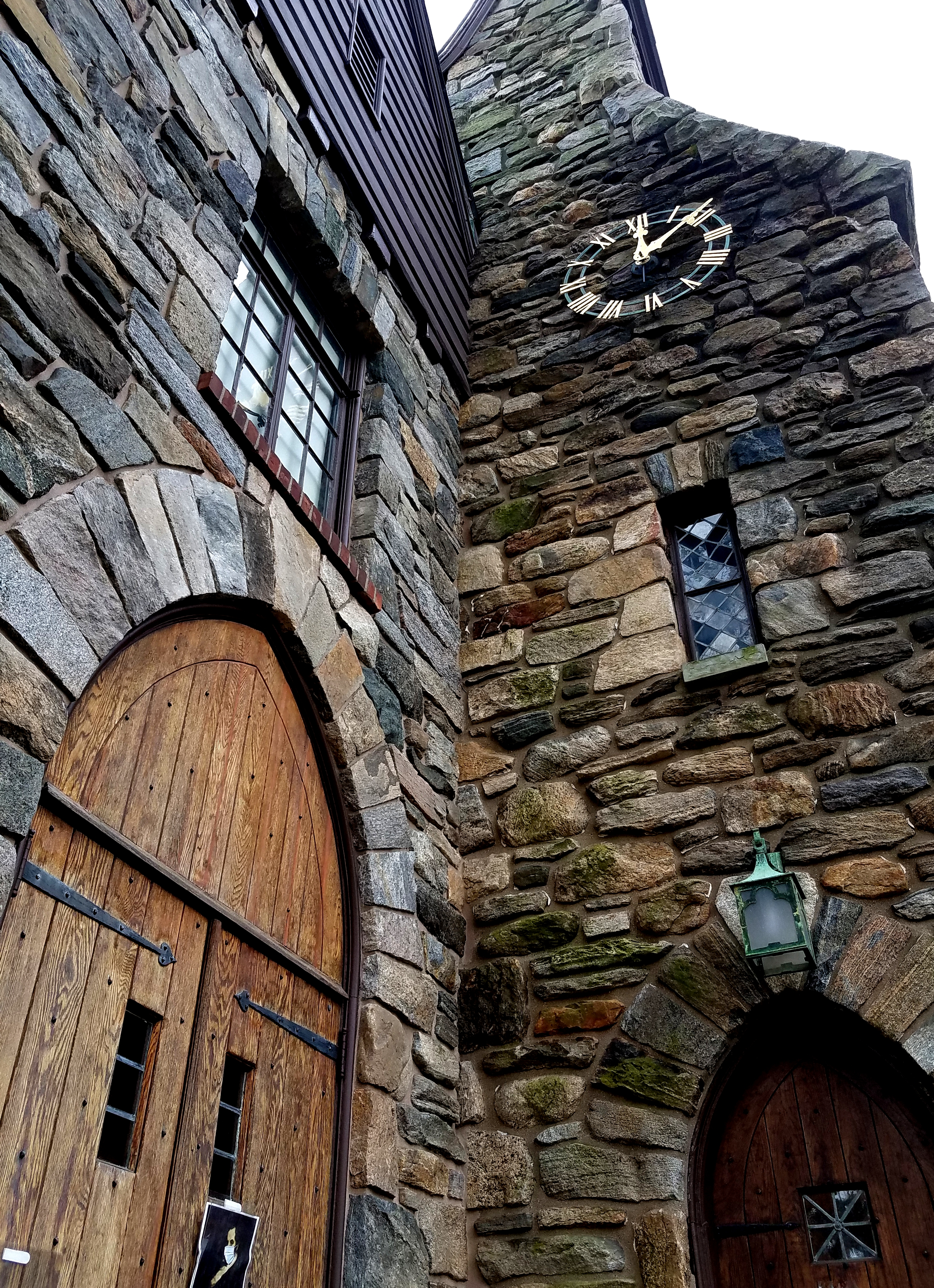
Exterior detail of the Union Church of Pocantico Hills, Westchester County, New York, United States, 1921

== See also ==
- Medieval stone churches in Finland
