= Morczyny =

- Village
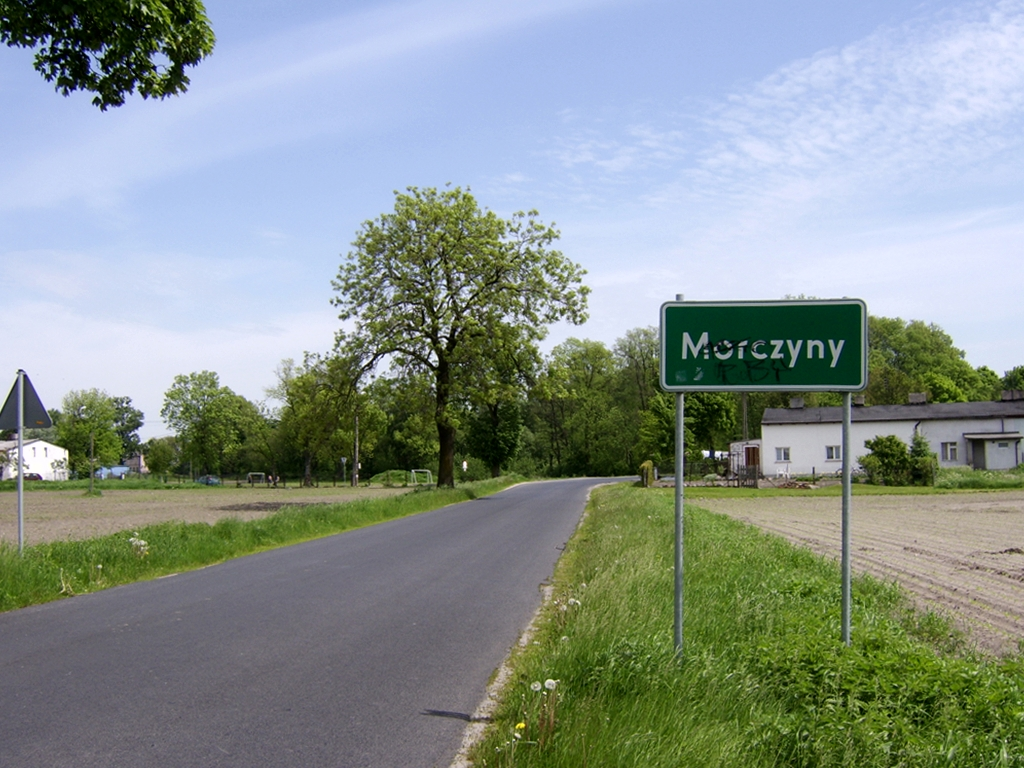
- Entering the village

- Location within Poland
- Coordinates: 53°08′25″N 18°41′41″E
- Country: Poland
- Voivodeship: Kuyavian-Pomeranian
- County: Toruń
- Gmina: Chełmża

Morczyny [mɔrˈt͡ʂɨnɨ] is a village in the administrative district of Gmina Chełmża, within Toruń County, Kuyavian-Pomeranian Voivodeship, in north-central Poland.
