= Nawra, Kuyavian-Pomeranian Voivodeship =

Nawra
- Village
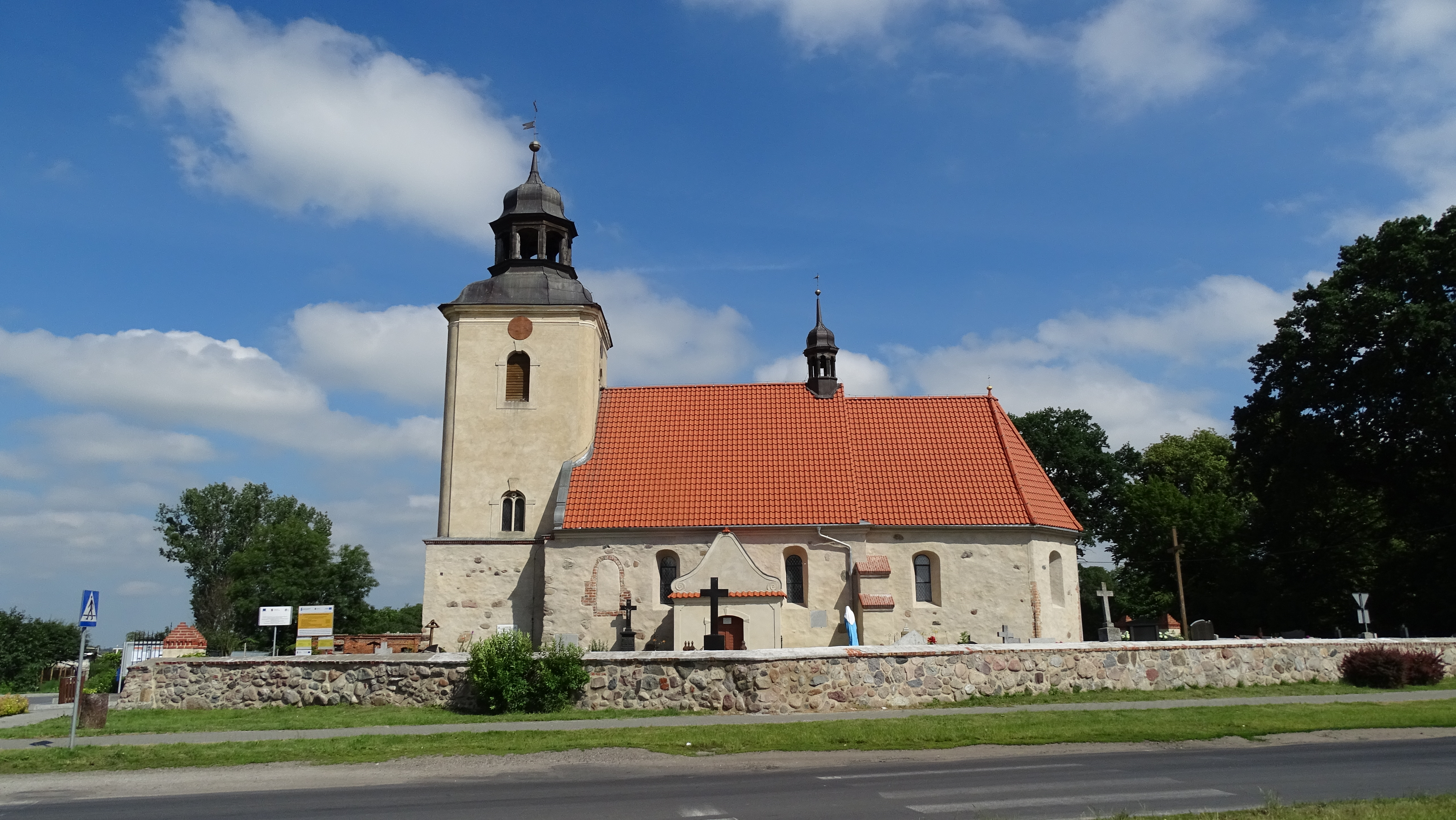
- Saint Catherine church in Nawra

- Location within Poland
- Coordinates: 53°11′29″N 18°30′7″E
- Country: Poland
- Voivodeship: Kuyavian-Pomeranian
- County: Toruń
- Gmina: Chełmża
- Population: 480
- Time zone: UTC+1 (CET)
  - Summer (DST): UTC+2 (CEST)
- Vehicle registration: CTR

Nawra [ˈnavra] is a village in the administrative district of Gmina Chełmża, within Toruń County, Kuyavian-Pomeranian Voivodeship, in north-central Poland.

The landmark heritage sites of Nawra are the Nawra Palace, which was the former residence of the Kruszyński and Sczaniecki families, and the Gothic-Baroque parish church of Saint Catherine of Alexandria, which dates back to the 14th century.
