= Grzywna, Kuyavian-Pomeranian Voivodeship =

Grzywna
- Village
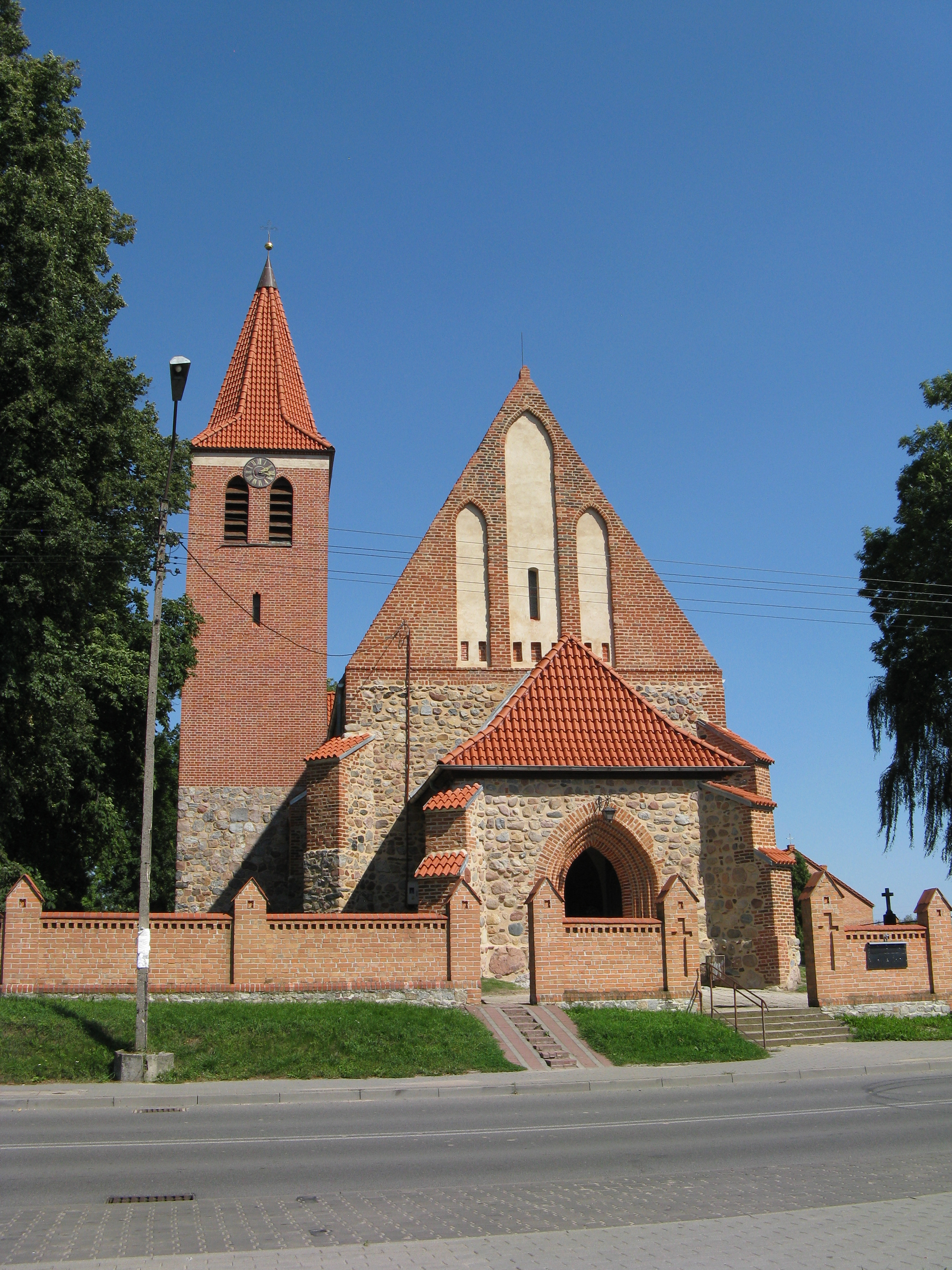
- Church of Saint Catherine of Alexandria

- Location within Poland
- Coordinates: 53°9′19″N 18°36′40″E
- Country: Poland
- Voivodeship: Kuyavian-Pomeranian
- County: Toruń
- Gmina: Chełmża

Population
  - Total: 1,500

Grzywna [ˈɡʐɨvna] is a village in the administrative district of Gmina Chełmża, within Toruń County, Kuyavian-Pomeranian Voivodeship, in north-central Poland.
