= Sławkowo, Kuyavian-Pomeranian Voivodeship =

Sławkowo
- Village
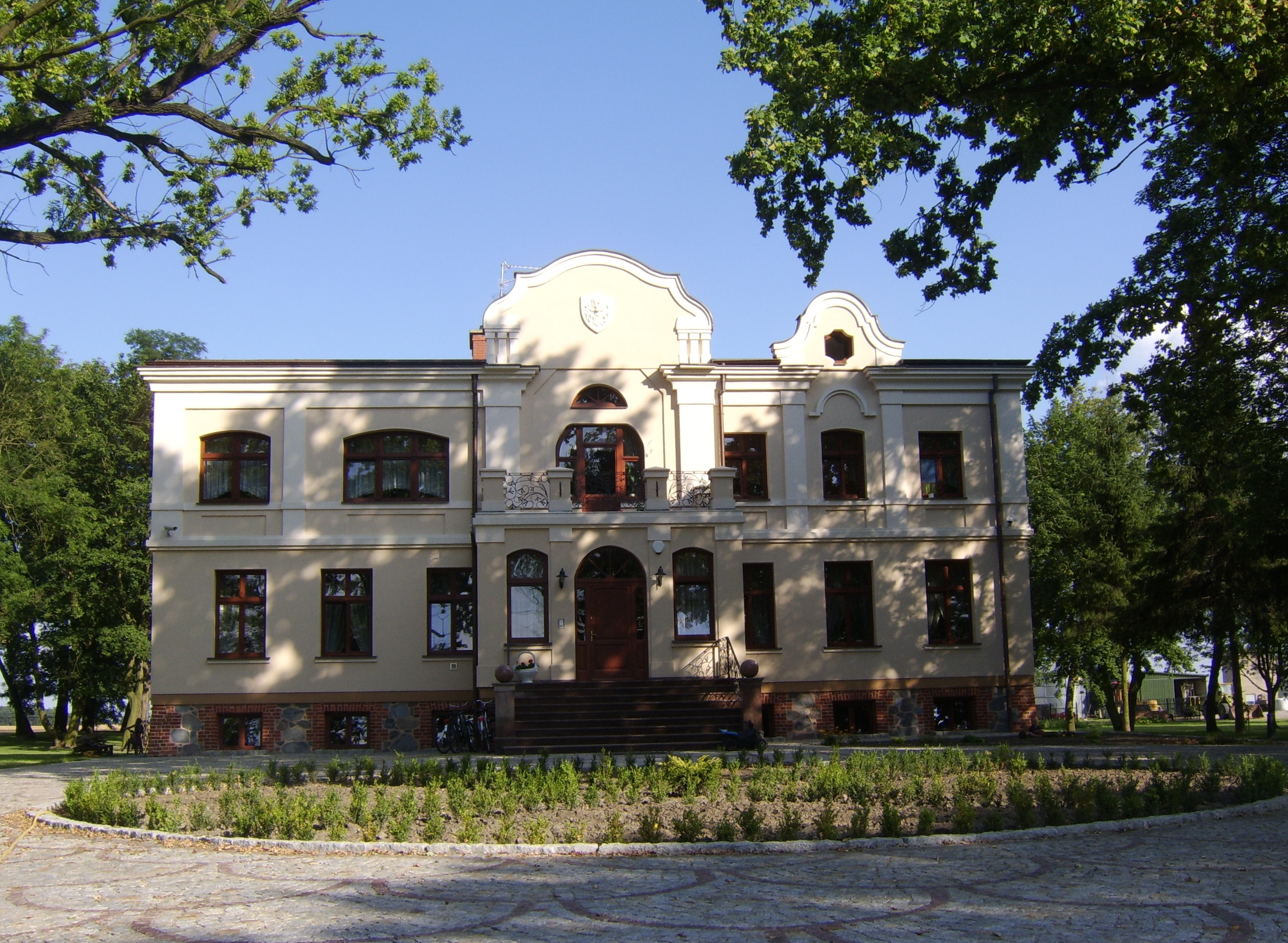
- Manor

- Location within Poland
- Coordinates: 53°8′5″N 18°40′26″E
- Country: Poland
- Voivodeship: Kuyavian-Pomeranian
- County: Toruń
- Gmina: Chełmża

Sławkowo [swafˈkɔvɔ] is a small village in the administrative district of Gmina Chełmża, within Toruń County, Kuyavian-Pomeranian Voivodeship, in north-central Poland.
