= Grodno, Toruń County =

Grodno
- Village
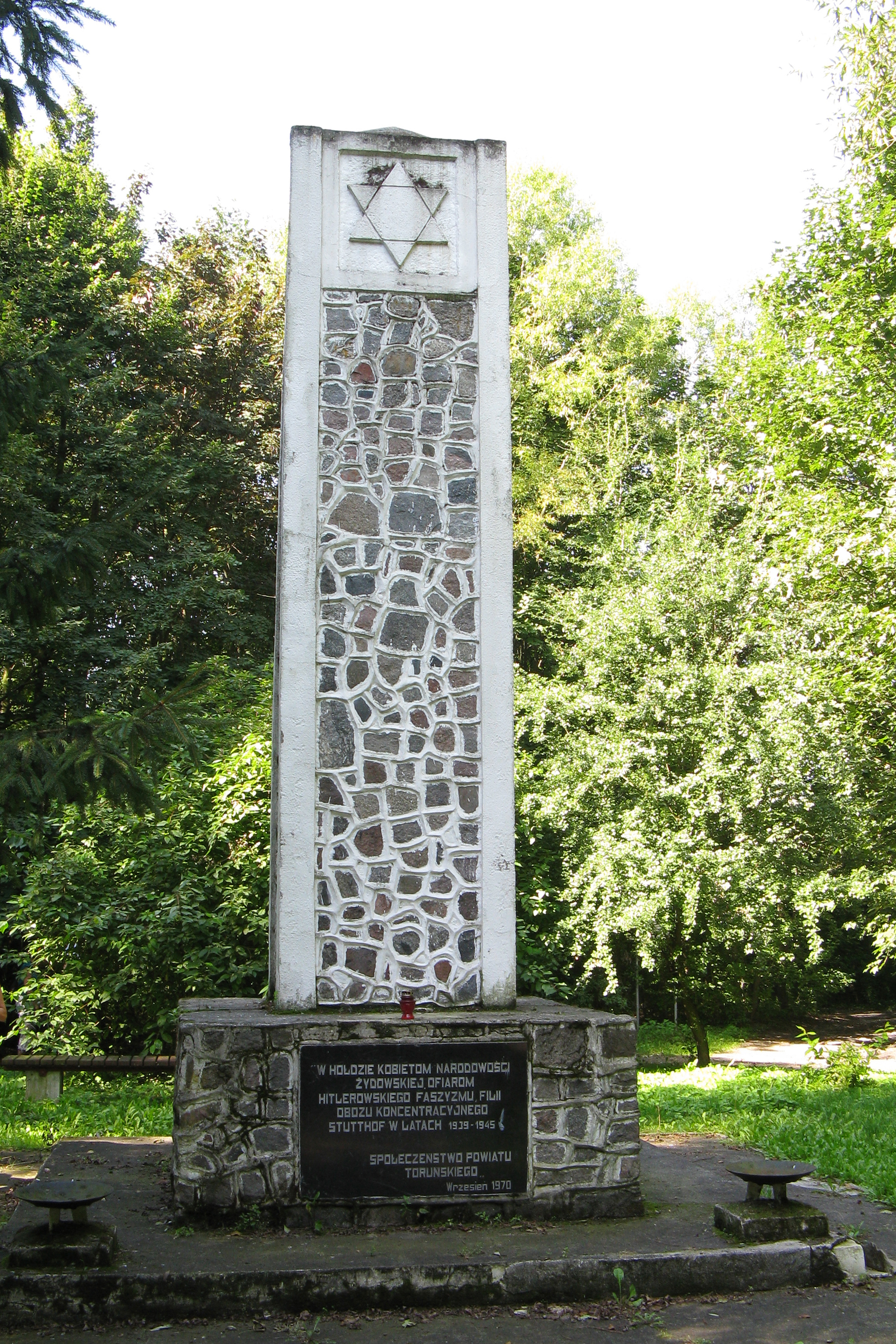

- Location within Poland
- Coordinates: 52°28′28″N 19°13′02″E
- Country: Poland
- Voivodeship: Kuyavian-Pomeranian
- County: Toruń
- Gmina: Chełmża

Grodno ([ˈɡrɔdnɔ]) is a village in the administrative district of Gmina Chełmża, within Toruń County, Kuyavian-Pomeranian Voivodeship, in north-central Poland.
