= Zajączkowo, Kuyavian-Pomeranian Voivodeship =

Zajączkowo
- Village
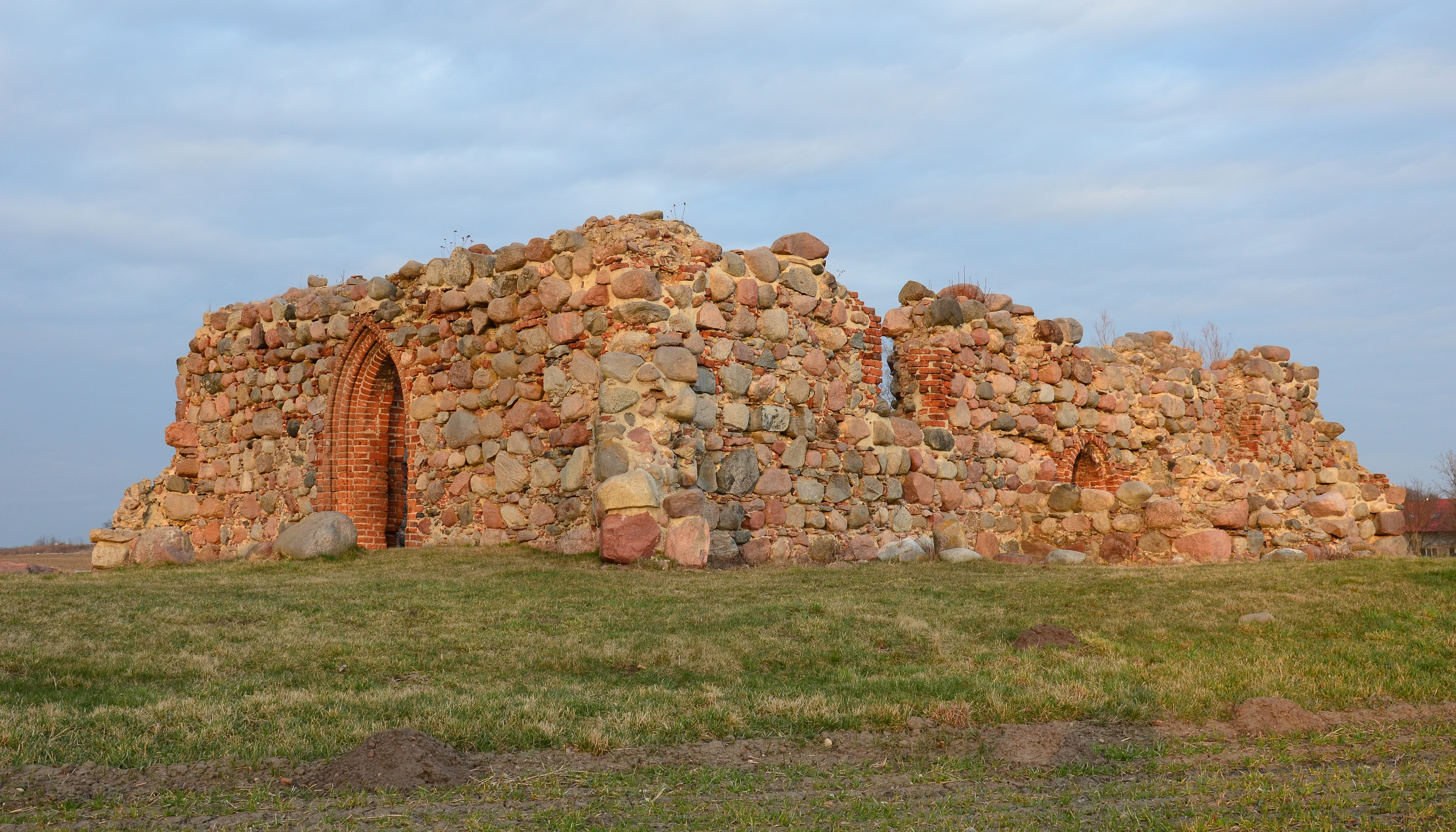
- Ruins of the Church of Saint John the Baptist

- Location within Poland
- Coordinates: 53°13′4″N 18°46′21″E
- Country: Poland
- Voivodeship: Kuyavian-Pomeranian
- County: Toruń
- Gmina: Chełmża

Zajączkowo [zajɔnt͡ʂˈkɔvɔ] is a village in the administrative district of Gmina Chełmża, within Toruń County, Kuyavian-Pomeranian Voivodeship, in north-central Poland.
