= Grzegorz, Kuyavian-Pomeranian Voivodeship =

Grzegorz
- Village
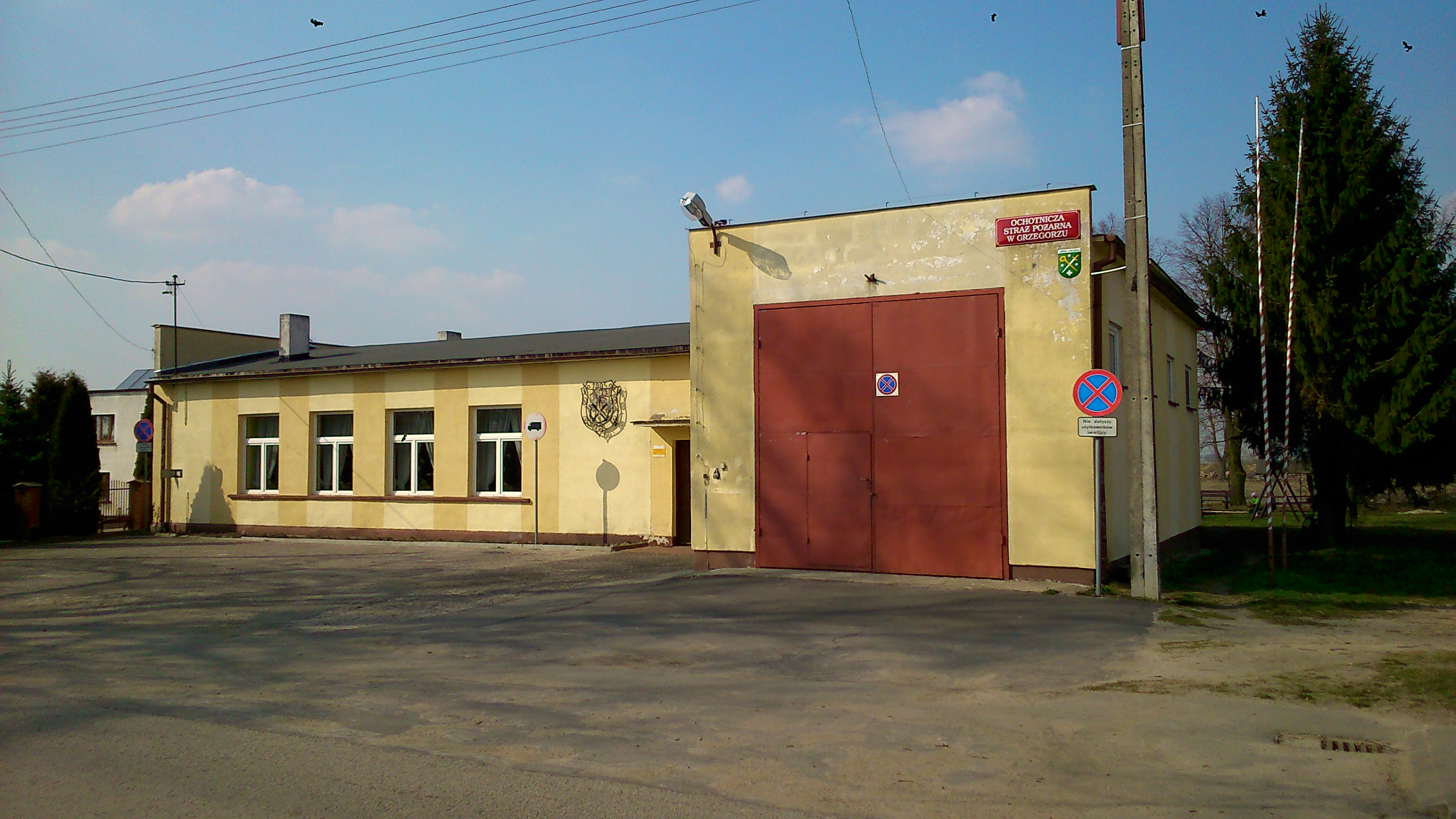
- Local Fire Station

- Location within Poland
- Coordinates: 53°13′50″N 18°40′41″E
- Country: Poland
- Voivodeship: Kuyavian-Pomeranian
- County: Toruń
- Gmina: Chełmża

Grzegorz [ˈɡʐɛɡɔʂ] is a village in the administrative district of Gmina Chełmża, within Toruń County, Kuyavian-Pomeranian Voivodeship, in north-central Poland.
