= Bocień =

- Village
- Location within Poland
- Coordinates: 53°14′45″N 18°44′34″E
- Country: Poland
- Voivodeship: Kuyavian-Pomeranian
- County: Toruń
- Gmina: Chełmża

Bocień [ˈbɔt͡ɕɛɲ] is a village in the administrative district of Gmina Chełmża, within Toruń County, Kuyavian-Pomeranian Voivodeship, in north-central Poland.

Bocień was the location of the German concentration camp Bottschin, a subcamp of the Stutthof concentration camp.
