= Heinrich Krüger =

Heinrich Krüger was a wealthy merchant in Torun during the 15th century. He was a councillor and mayor of Torun many times, and was prominent among the patricians of Torun.

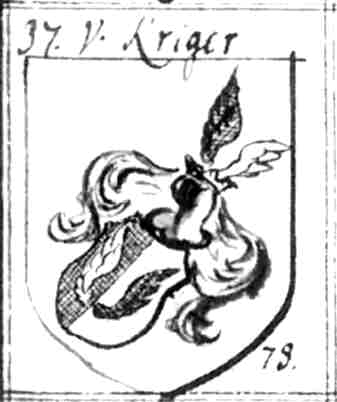
The Coat of Arms of the polish Krüger family.

== Origin ==
Heinrich Krüger was born in approximately 1430. Heinrich Krüger's origin is not fully known, but he is assumed to be from either Culm or Cologne. He appeared in Torun for the first time in 1462.

== Early life ==
In 1462, he appeared in Torun representing the Torun merchant Tiedemann Bye, mediating and representing his transactions. In 1470 he became a citizen of Torun.

Being a full citizen of Torun and thanks to the Rockendorfs, a family of the highest social class whom Krüger had connections with, Krüger was elected a juror of Torun in 1471. In 1473 he was a councilor, performing various duties, such as managing the building of a brick and limestone house, managing of the Kamlaria, as well as managing the ferry crossing on the Vistula.

== Rise to prominence ==
In 1483, he achieved the title of first mayor, holding this position many times later. Then in the years 1494, 1496, and 1499 to 1503 he served as a burgrave - a representative of the Polish king in Torun. At the same time, he was one of the richest merchants not only in Torun, but throughout Royal Prussia, buying 11 houses in Torun during the years 1494–1502.

He also granted loans not only to merchants, but also to King Jan Olbracht, for which he received three royal villages: Rogowo, Rogówko and Kończewice. Apart from these, he was also the owner of 8 villages.

== Prominence in Royal Prussia ==
Around 1484, Krüger entered into an alliance with a powerful Torun patrician family - von Allen. Krüger married Christina, the daughter of Mayor Tideman von Allen and the niece of the late bishop of Warmia, Lucas Watzenrode.

In the 15th century, when he reached the position of councilor, he began to be active in the external affairs of Torun and its interests. He was one of the most prominent mayors of Torun at the time and the leader of the merchant elite; he participated several times in congresses of the Prussian families representing Torun. He also defended the Torun composition law, and demanded the withdrawal of the ban on Torun's trade with foreign merchants in Danzig. He also fought to close the road through Nakło and Tuchola bypassing Torun to Danzig. He took part in the envoys of the Prussian states to the Polish king. In 1491, at the congress of the Prussian states in Grudziądz, he represented Torun. With his wife Christina, the two funded the building of the Torun bridge. In addition, they granted a loan to the Patricians to finalize the Peace of Torun in 1466 on behalf of Ebenhard Pape.

As a councillor, Heinrich had to negotiate with the king for the first time in 1493 about the stacking right of his hometown. This privilege meant that all goods shipped on the Vistula had to be offered for sale to the Torun merchants.

Heinrich had to go through a strange story in the year 1497, in which he was mayor. A man by the name Franz Fengelhelm had painted a gallows on top of Heinrich's coat of arms and made insulting speeches about the four mayors of the city. Under the chairmanship of Heinrich, the city council put Fengelhelm in prison and had him interrogated. He denied all detriviate remarks and was released from prison after serving a mild sentence. But he had to make a public statement that he had painted the gallows in the mayor's coat of arms.

== Death ==
Heinrich died June 19, 1505. He was buried in the church of the blessed Virgin Mary in Torun. On his tombstone is the inscription: "Hie lit Henrich Kriger 1505." Above the inscription was his coat of arms. The tombstone however, has not survived to this day.

== Family ==
He married Christina Von Allen, the granddaughter of Lucas Watzenrode (the elder), in 1484 in Torun. The couple had three sons and two daughters. Their oldest son, John, became a cathedral master in Culm. Their second son, Tiedeman Albert, became a councillor in Torun in 1513, but died not long after. Their oldest daughter Gertrude died last of the children, as she was the heir to her father's fortune. Their second daughter Anna, married Arend Von Der Schelling. Their youngest son, Lucas, named after his great-grandfather became a councillor in Torun as well.

== Sources ==
- "Malowidła w kamienicy ul. Szeroka 19 - TorunTour PL"
- Krzysztof Mikulski- ”Wymiana elity władzy w Toruniu w drugiej połowie XV wieku”
