= Nowa Chełmża =

- Village
- Location within Poland
- Coordinates: 53°12′24″N 18°38′34″E
- Country: Poland
- Voivodeship: Kuyavian-Pomeranian
- County: Toruń
- Gmina: Chełmża
- Time zone: UTC+1 (CET)
  - Summer (DST): UTC+2 (CEST)
- Vehicle registration: CTR

Nowa Chełmża [ˈnɔva ˈxɛu̯mʐa] is a village in the administrative district of Gmina Chełmża, within Toruń County, Kuyavian-Pomeranian Voivodeship, in north-central Poland. It is located in Chełmno Land within the historic region of Pomerania.

During the German occupation of Poland (World War II), Nowa Chełmża was one of the sites of executions of Poles, carried out by the Germans in 1939 as part of the Intelligenzaktion.
