= Parowa Falęcka =

- Village
- Location within Poland
- Coordinates: 53°12′51″N 18°31′22″E
- Country: Poland
- Voivodeship: Kuyavian-Pomeranian
- County: Toruń
- Gmina: Chełmża
- Population: 150

Parowa Falęcka [paˈrɔva faˈlɛnt͡ska] is a village in the administrative district of Gmina Chełmża, within Toruń County, Kuyavian-Pomeranian Voivodeship, in north-central Poland.
