= Gmina Chełmża =

Gmina Chełmża Chełmża Commune
- Gmina
- Flag Coat of arms

- Location within Poland
- Coordinates (Chełmża): 53°12′N 18°36′E
- Country: Poland
- Voivodeship: Kuyavian-Pomeranian
- County: Toruń County
- Seat: Chełmża

Area
  - Total: 178.72 km^{2} (69.00 sq mi)

Population (2006)
  - Total: 9,447
  - Density: 52.86/km^{2} (136.9/sq mi)
- Website: http://www.gminachelmza.pl/

Gmina Chełmża is a rural gmina (administrative district) in Toruń County, Kuyavian-Pomeranian Voivodeship, in north-central Poland. Its seat is the town of Chełmża, although the town is not part of the territory of the gmina.

The gmina covers an area of 178.72 square kilometres (69.0 sq mi), and as of 2006 its total population is 9,447.

== Villages ==
Gmina Chełmża contains the villages and settlements of Bielczyny, Bocień, Bogusławki, Brąchnówko, Browina, Drzonówko, Dziemiony, Dźwierzno, Głuchowo, Głuchowo-Windak, Grodno, Grzegorz, Grzywna, Januszewo, Kiełbasin, Kończewice, Kuczwały, Liznowo, Mirakowo, Morczyny, Nawra, Nowa Chełmża, Parowa Falęcka, Pluskowęsy, Skąpe, Sławkowo, Strużal, Świętosław, Szerokopas, Witkowo, Zajączkowo, Zalesie, Zelgno and Zelgno-Bezdół.

== Neighbouring gminas ==
Gmina Chełmża is bordered by the town of Chełmża and by the gminas of Kijewo Królewskie, Kowalewo Pomorskie, Lisewo, Łubianka, Łysomice, Papowo Biskupie, Płużnica and Wąbrzeźno.

== Gallery ==
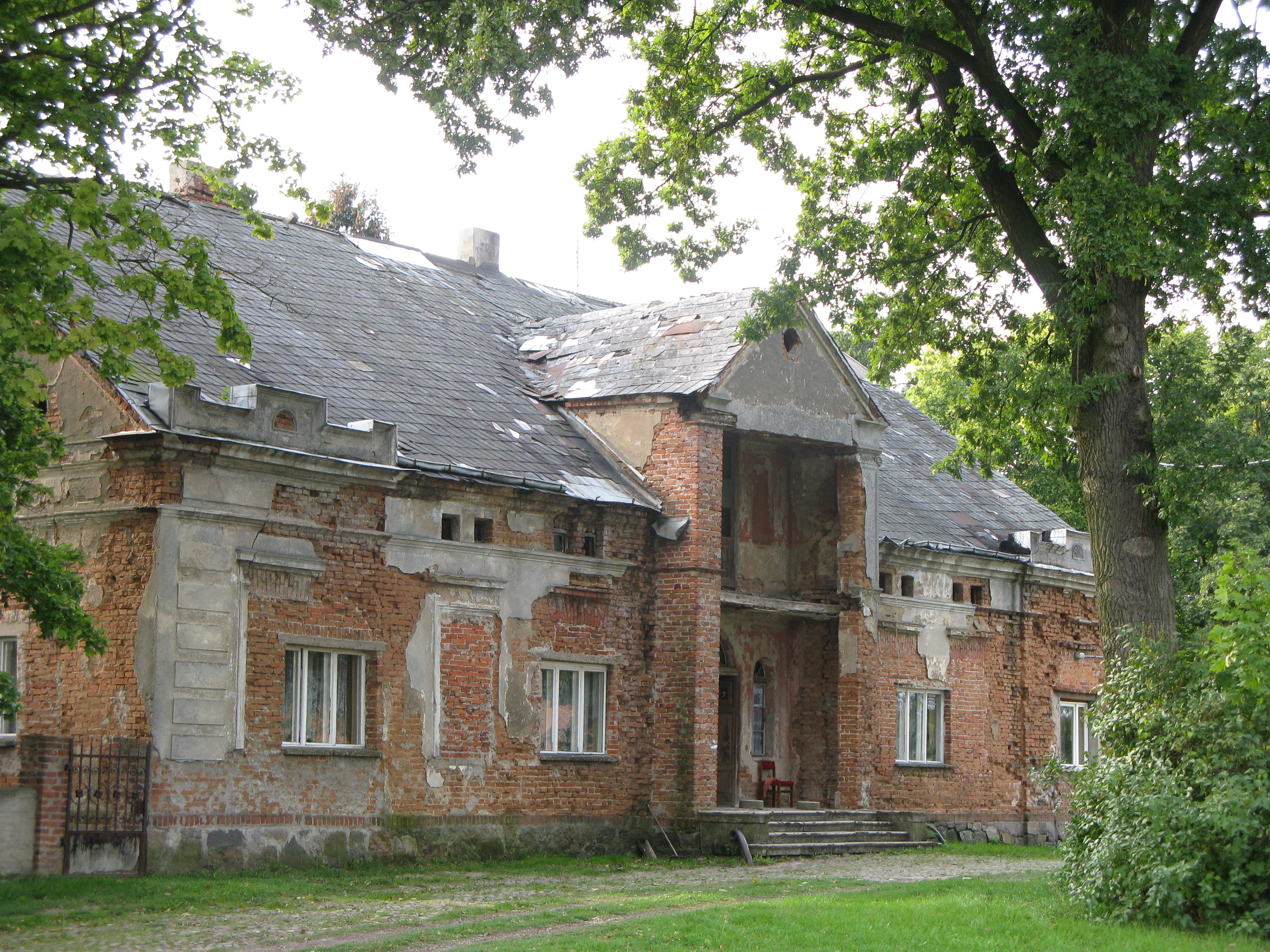
Witkowo Manor House

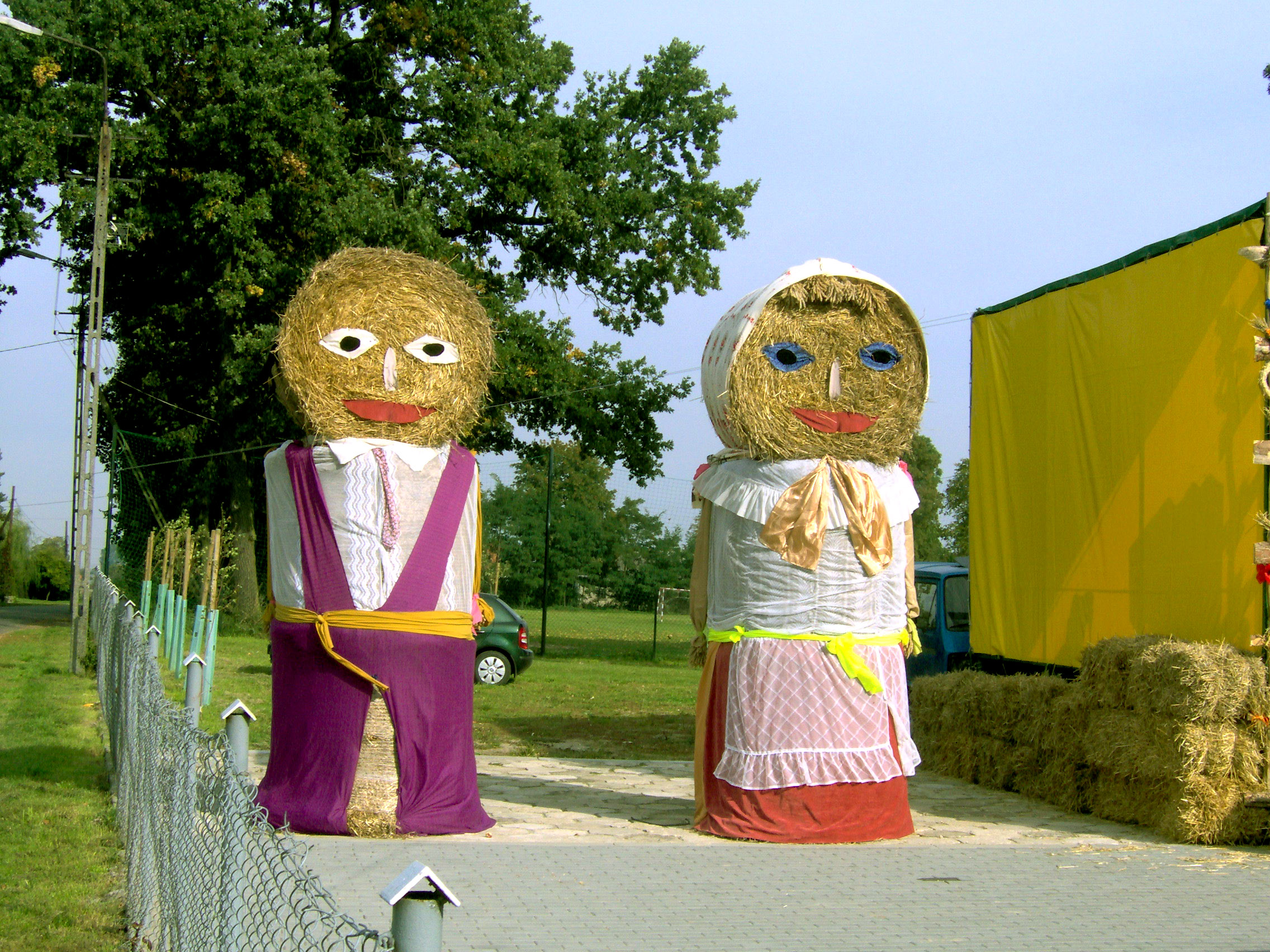
File:Kuczwały Dożynki1.jpg

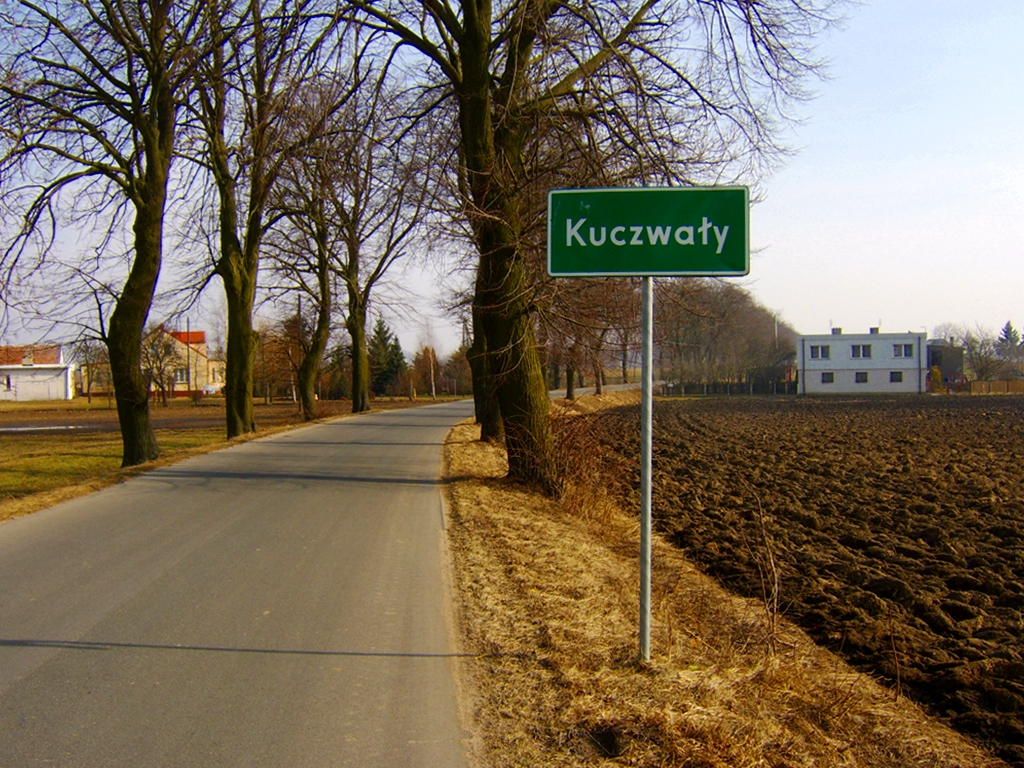
Kuczwały

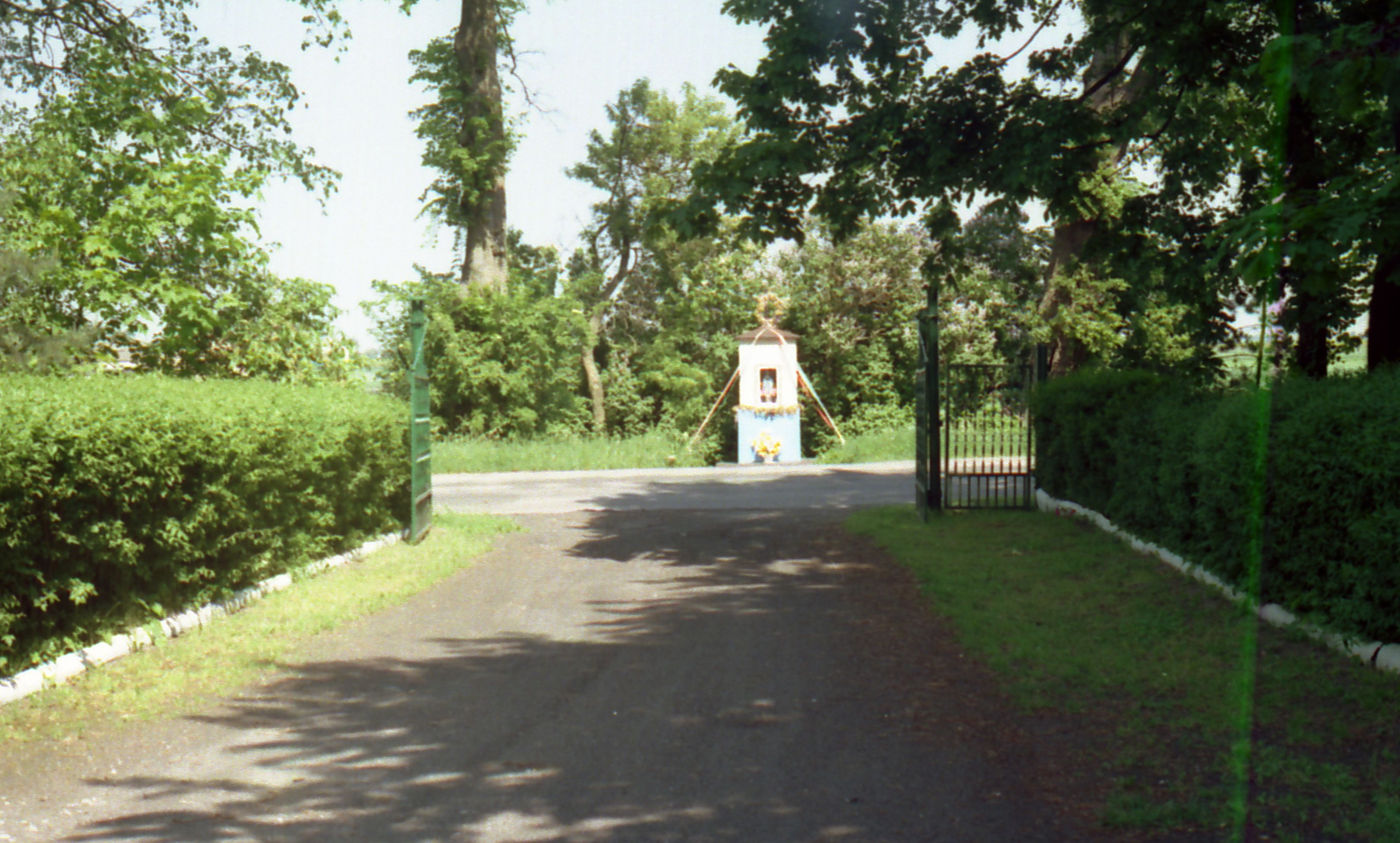
Brąchnówko chapel

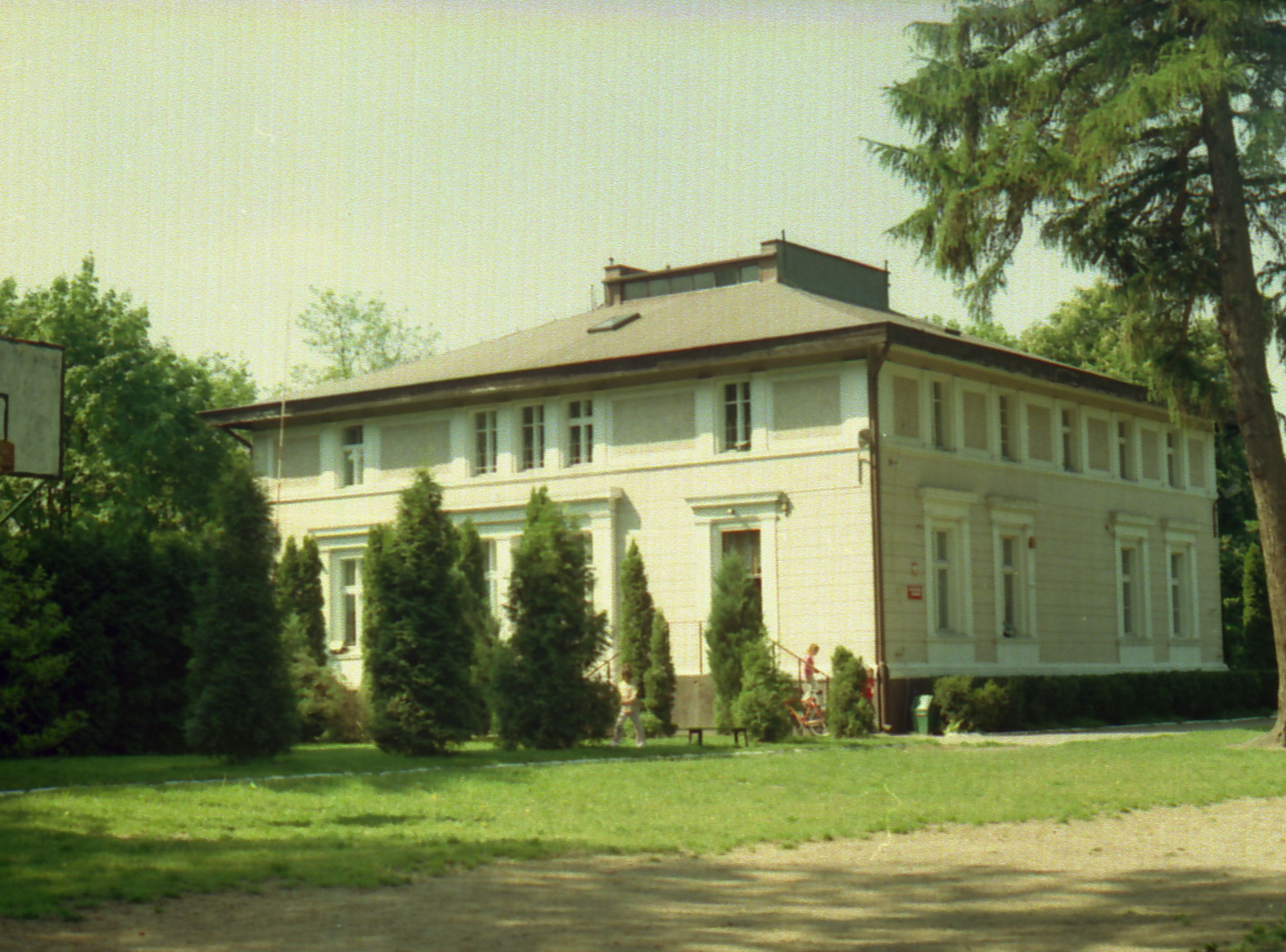
Brąchnówko court

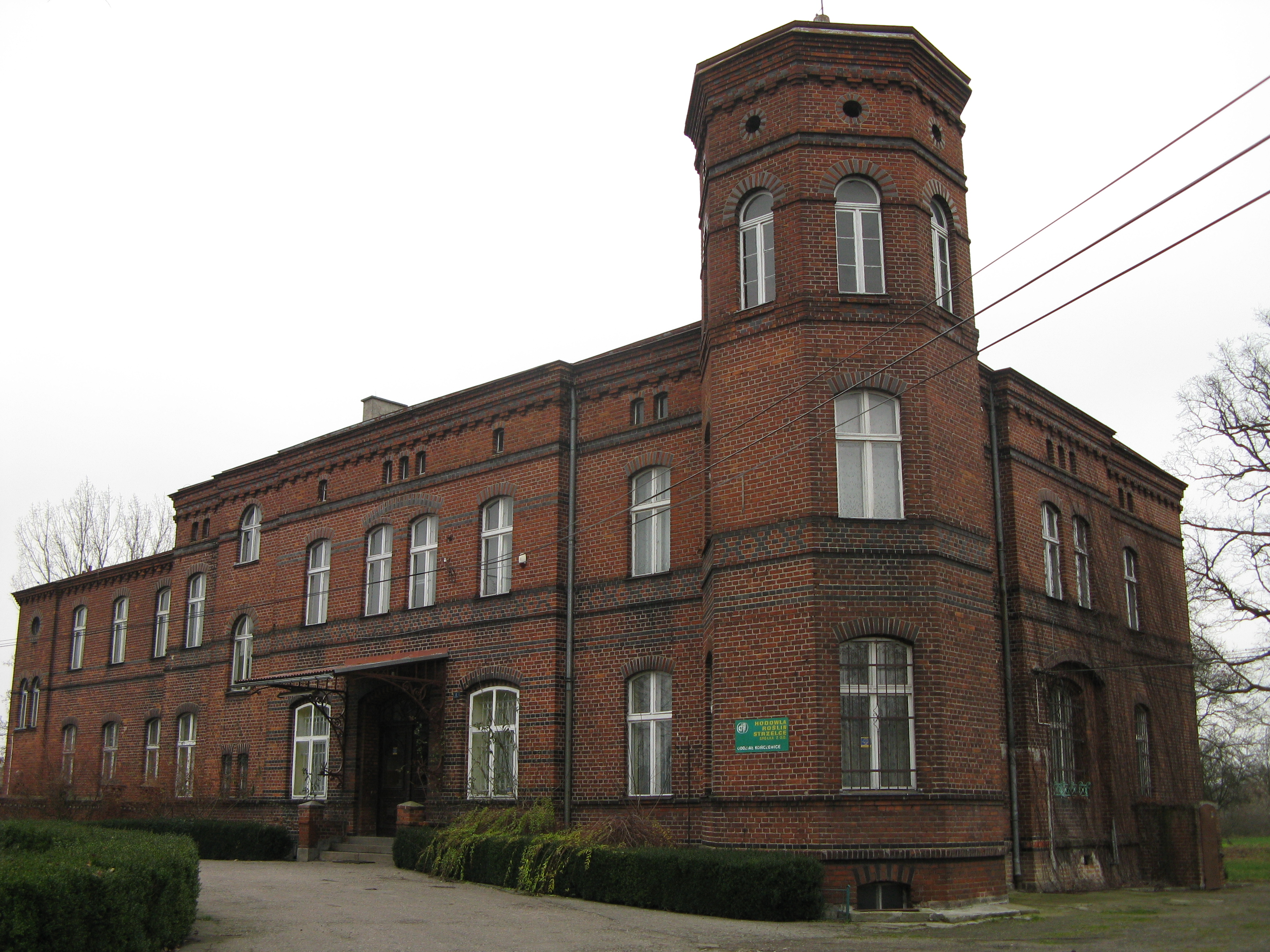
Neo-Gothic palace in Kończewicach
