= Kiełbasin =

- Village
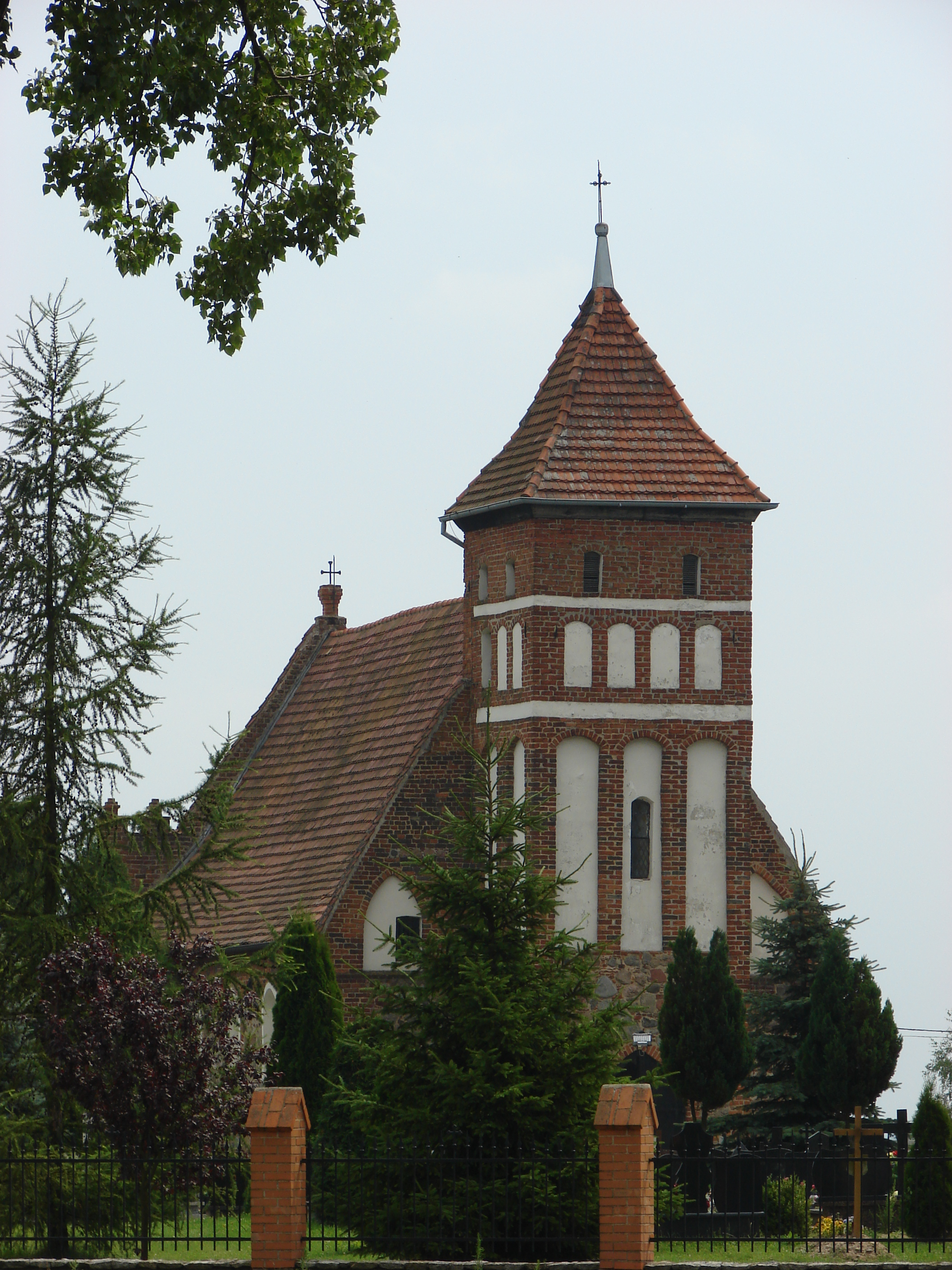
- Parish church of Virgin Mary, built in the first half of the 14th century.

- Location within Poland
- Coordinates: 53°10′6″N 18°44′5″E
- Country: Poland
- Voivodeship: Kuyavian-Pomeranian
- County: Toruń
- Gmina: Chełmża

Kiełbasin [kʲɛu̯ˈbaɕin] is a village in the administrative district of Gmina Chełmża, within Toruń County, Kuyavian-Pomeranian Voivodeship, in north-central Poland.
