= Januszewo, Kuyavian-Pomeranian Voivodeship =

Januszewo
- Village
- Location within Poland
- Coordinates: 53°12′10″N 18°45′3″E
- Country: Poland
- Voivodeship: Kuyavian-Pomeranian
- County: Toruń
- Gmina: Chełmża

Januszewo ([januˈʂɛvɔ]; German: Janusch, 1942–45 Hansberg) is a village in the administrative district of Gmina Chełmża, within Toruń County, Kuyavian-Pomeranian Voivodeship, in north-central Poland.
