= Browina, Kuyavian-Pomeranian Voivodeship =

Browina
- Village
- Location within Poland
- Coordinates: 53°9′8″N 18°34′48″E
- Country: Poland
- Voivodeship: Kuyavian-Pomeranian
- County: Toruń
- Gmina: Chełmża

Browina [brɔˈvina] is a village in the administrative district of Gmina Chełmża, within Toruń County, Kuyavian-Pomeranian Voivodeship, in north-central Poland.
