= Kuczwały =

- Village
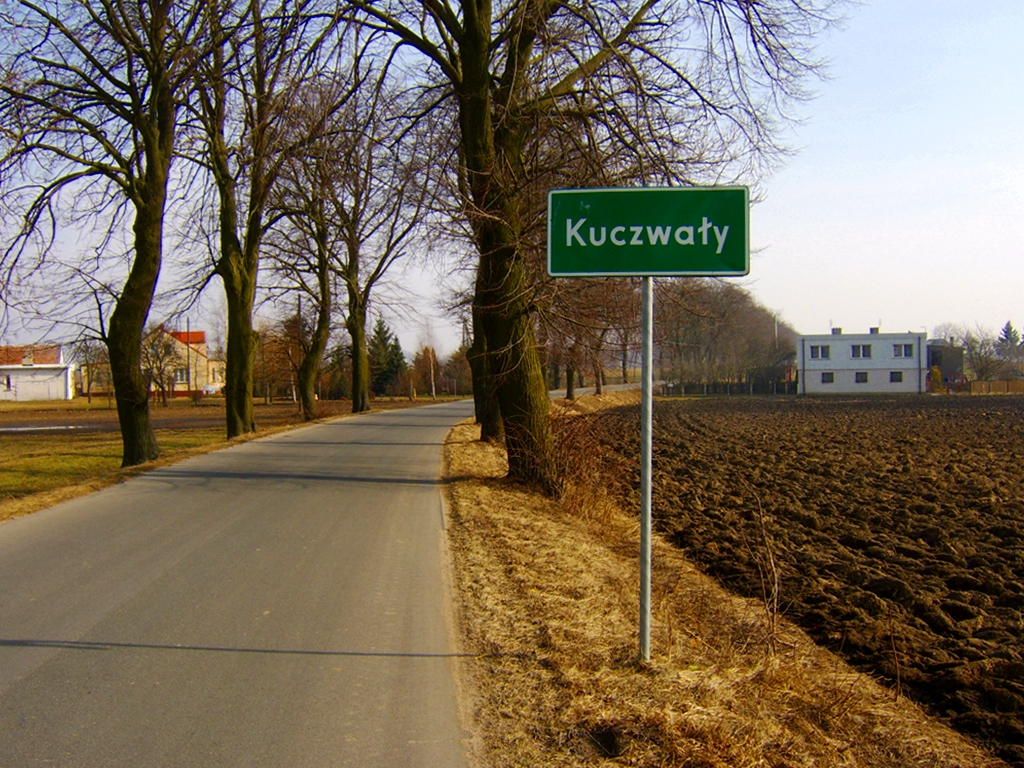
- Entering the village

- Location within Poland
- Coordinates: 53°8′42″N 18°39′1″E
- Country: Poland
- Voivodeship: Kuyavian-Pomeranian
- County: Toruń
- Gmina: Chełmża

Kuczwały [kut͡ʂˈfawɨ] is a village in the administrative district of Gmina Chełmża, within Toruń County, Kuyavian-Pomeranian Voivodeship, in north-central Poland.
