= Bogusławki, Kuyavian-Pomeranian Voivodeship =

Bogusławki
- Village
- Location within Poland
- Coordinates: 53°11′10″N 18°31′9″E
- Country: Poland
- Voivodeship: Kuyavian-Pomeranian
- County: Toruń
- Gmina: Chełmża

Bogusławki [bɔɡuˈswafki] is a village in the administrative district of Gmina Chełmża, within Toruń County, Kuyavian-Pomeranian Voivodeship, in north-central Poland.
