= Drzonówko =

- Village
- Location within Poland
- Coordinates: 53°14′N 18°41′E
- Country: Poland
- Voivodeship: Kuyavian-Pomeranian
- County: Toruń
- Gmina: Chełmża

Drzonówko [dʐɔˈnufkɔ] is a village in the administrative district of Gmina Chełmża, within Toruń County, Kuyavian-Pomeranian Voivodeship, in north-central Poland.
