= Svatoslav (Třebíč District) =

- Municipality
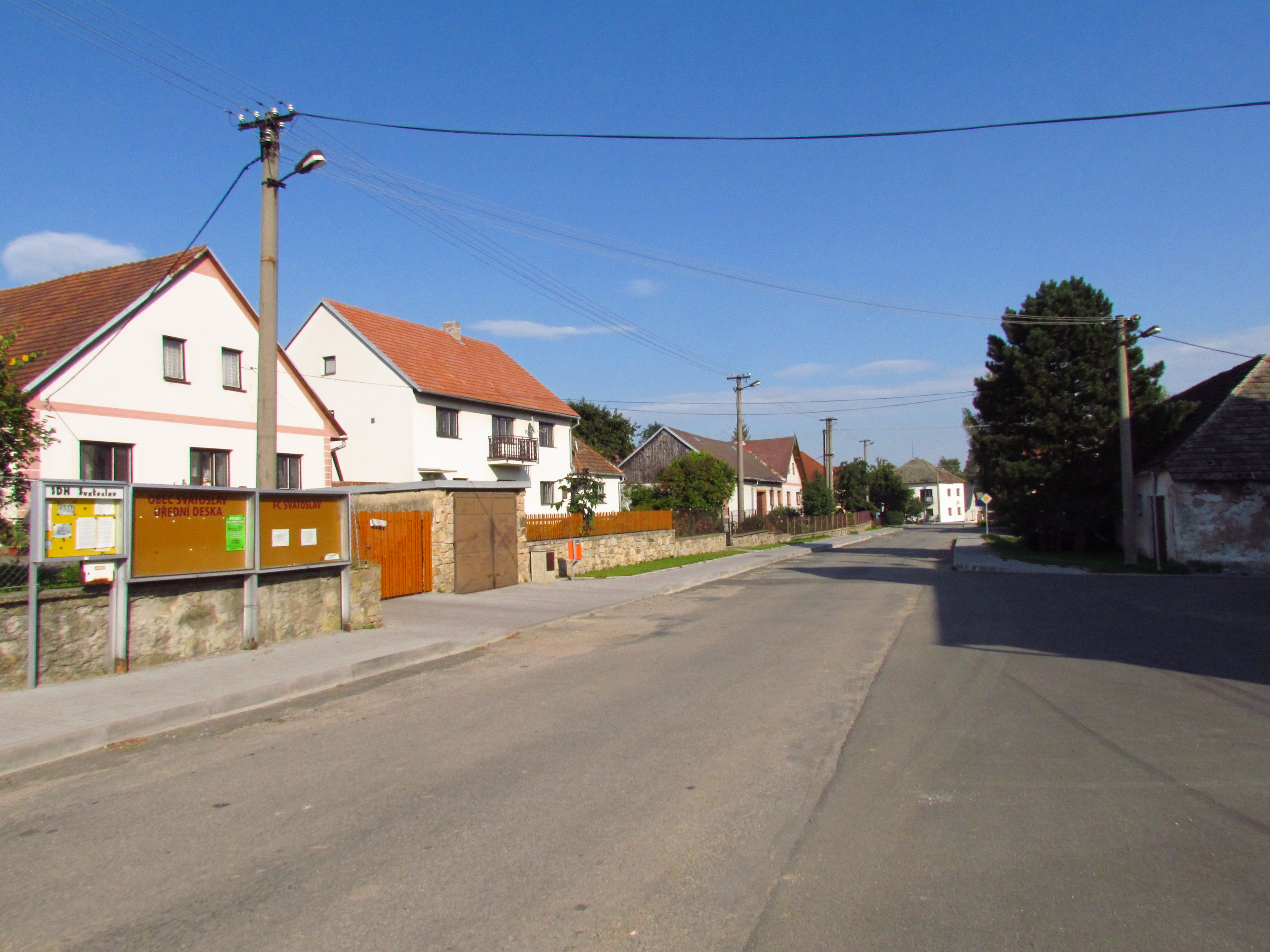
- Centre of Svatoslav

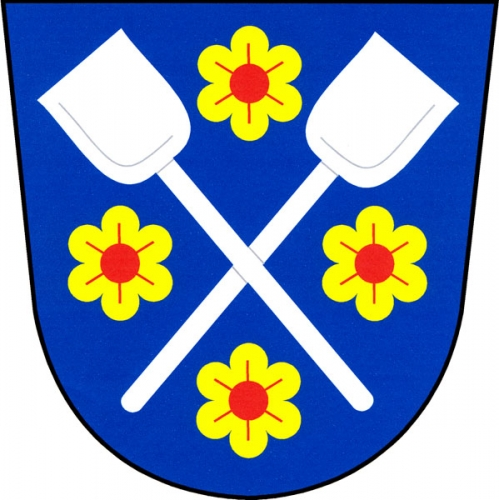
- Flag Coat of arms

- Location in the Czech Republic
- Coordinates: 49°19′9″N 15°50′55″E
- Country: Czech Republic
- Region: Vysočina
- District: Třebíč
- First mentioned: 1290

Area
  - Total: 19.29 km^{2} (7.45 sq mi)
- Elevation: 544 m (1,785 ft)

Population (2026-01-01)
  - Total: 279
  - Density: 14.5/km^{2} (37.5/sq mi)
- Time zone: UTC+1 (CET)
  - Summer (DST): UTC+2 (CEST)
- Postal code: 675 07
- Website: www.obecsvatoslav.cz

Svatoslav is a municipality and village in Třebíč District in the Vysočina Region of the Czech Republic. It has about 300 inhabitants.

Svatoslav lies approximately 13 kilometres (8 mi) north of Třebíč, 20 km (12 mi) east of Jihlava, and 133 km (83 mi) south-east of Prague.

== Demographics ==
Historical population
Year	Pop.	±%
1869	445	—
1880	468	+5.2%
1890	456	−2.6%
1900	450	−1.3%
1910	440	−2.2%
1921	418	−5.0%
1930	404	−3.3%
1950	311	−23.0%
1961	333	+7.1%
1970	313	−6.0%
1980	268	−14.4%
1991	263	−1.9%
2001	265	+0.8%
2011	240	−9.4%
2021	230	−4.2%
Source: Censuses
