= Kończewice, Kuyavian-Pomeranian Voivodeship =

Kończewice
- Village
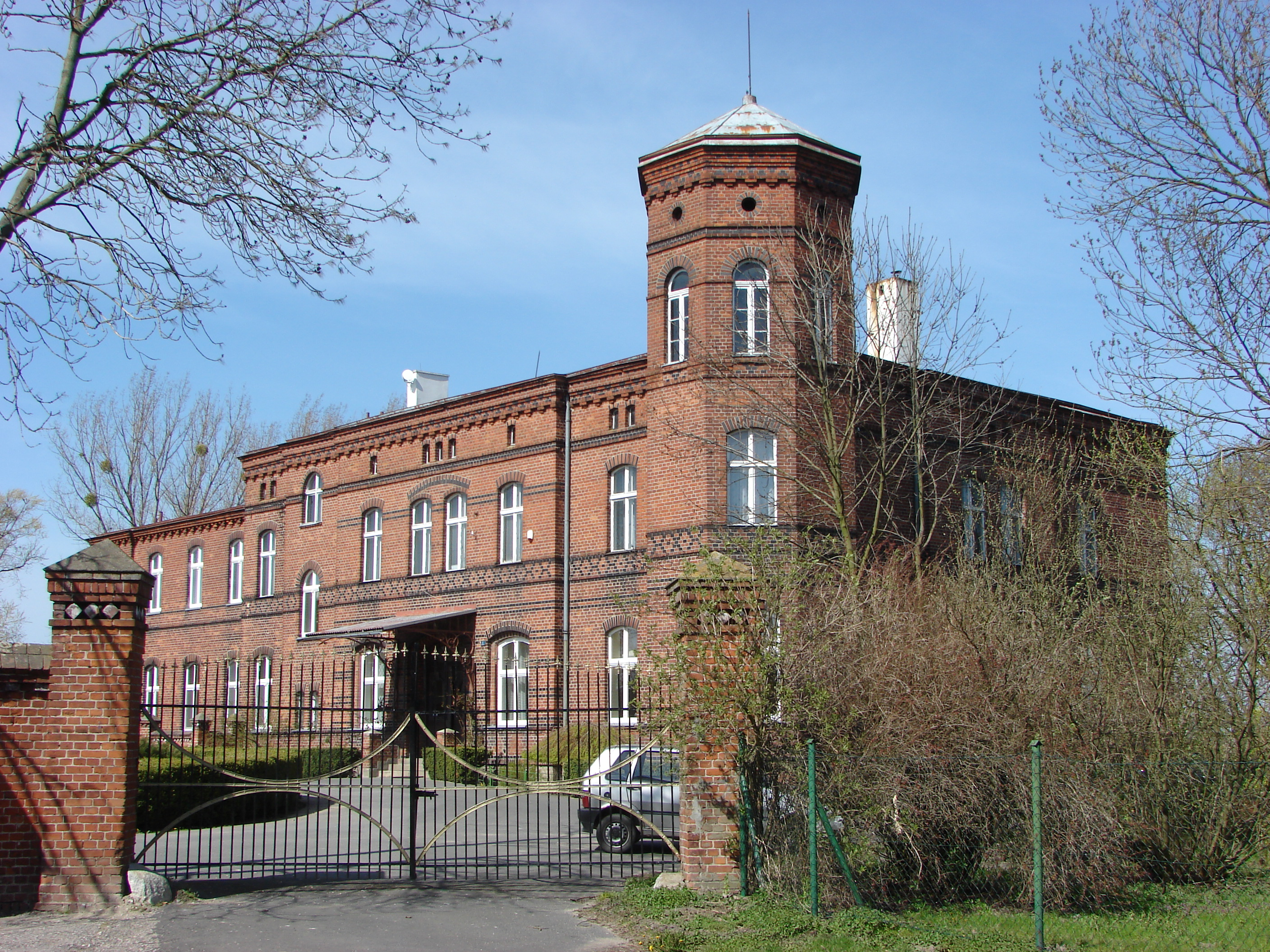
- Manor house, 19th century.

- Location within Poland
- Coordinates: 53°10′55″N 18°33′20″E
- Country: Poland
- Voivodeship: Kuyavian-Pomeranian
- County: Toruń
- Gmina: Chełmża

Kończewice [kɔɲt͡ʂɛˈvit͡sɛ] is a village in the administrative district of Gmina Chełmża, within Toruń County, Kuyavian-Pomeranian Voivodeship, in north-central Poland.
