= Lucas Watzenrode the Elder =

Thorn patrician and city councillor; Maternal Grandfather of Nicolaus Copernicus

Lucas Watzenrode (also, in German, Lukas; in Polish, Łukasz) (1400, in Thorn — 1462, in Thorn) was the maternal grandfather of Nicolaus Copernicus.

== Life ==
Lucas Watzenrode the Elder was registered in the Thorn citizen registry book (Thorner Bürgerbuch) as landowner, businessmen, judge, councilman, etc. In 1436, he married the widow of Heinrich Peckau, Katharina, whose familial origin is not clear. Some sources state she was from the Rusop family, while others state her name as von Rüdiger or Modlibóg. In 1448, he and other Thorn burghers are registered as having been summoned to the court at Limburg.

He was a loyal supporter of the Prussian Confederation in the Thirteen Years' War (1454–1466). During this time, he lent money to the city of Thorn for war purposes. In 1454–1455, he was injured in the battle of Lessen (now Łasin) against the mercenaries that were hired by the Teutonic Knights. The same year, he participated in the battle of Marienburg (now Malbork).

Later, Lucas participated in conventions with king Casimir and in 1461 he spoke sharply with a demand for more vigorous war and a threat that the Prussian states would seek a new king. According to Karol Górski's biography (1973): "The king let it go despite his ears, but he remembered Lucas".

Lucas and his wife Katharina had three confirmed children. One of their daughters, Barbara, married Nicolas Kopernik. Barbara's sister Christina married Tideman von Allen. Both sisters married in Thorn. Christina's daughter married the wealthy merchant Heinrich Krüger.

Lucas Watzenrode the Elder's grandson became known as Nicolaus Copernicus. Copernicus had an uncle, his mother's brother, also named Lucas Watzenrode (known as Lucas Watzenrode the Younger).

Christina and Tideman's daughter Cordula von Allen married Reinhold Feldstedt, who was born in 1468 in Danzig (now Gdańsk) and died in 1529 in Danzig. Their daughter Katharina Feldstedt married Herman Giese, born in 1523 in Danzig. A descendant was Tiedemann Giese, a famous bishop of Ermland. Another daughter of Christina and Tideman, Barbara, married Johan Von Beutel. A descendant of them was Regina Basilier, née Kleinfeldt.

== See also ==
- Bishops of Warmia
- Nicolaus Copernicus
