= Svatoslav (Brno-Country District) =

- Municipality
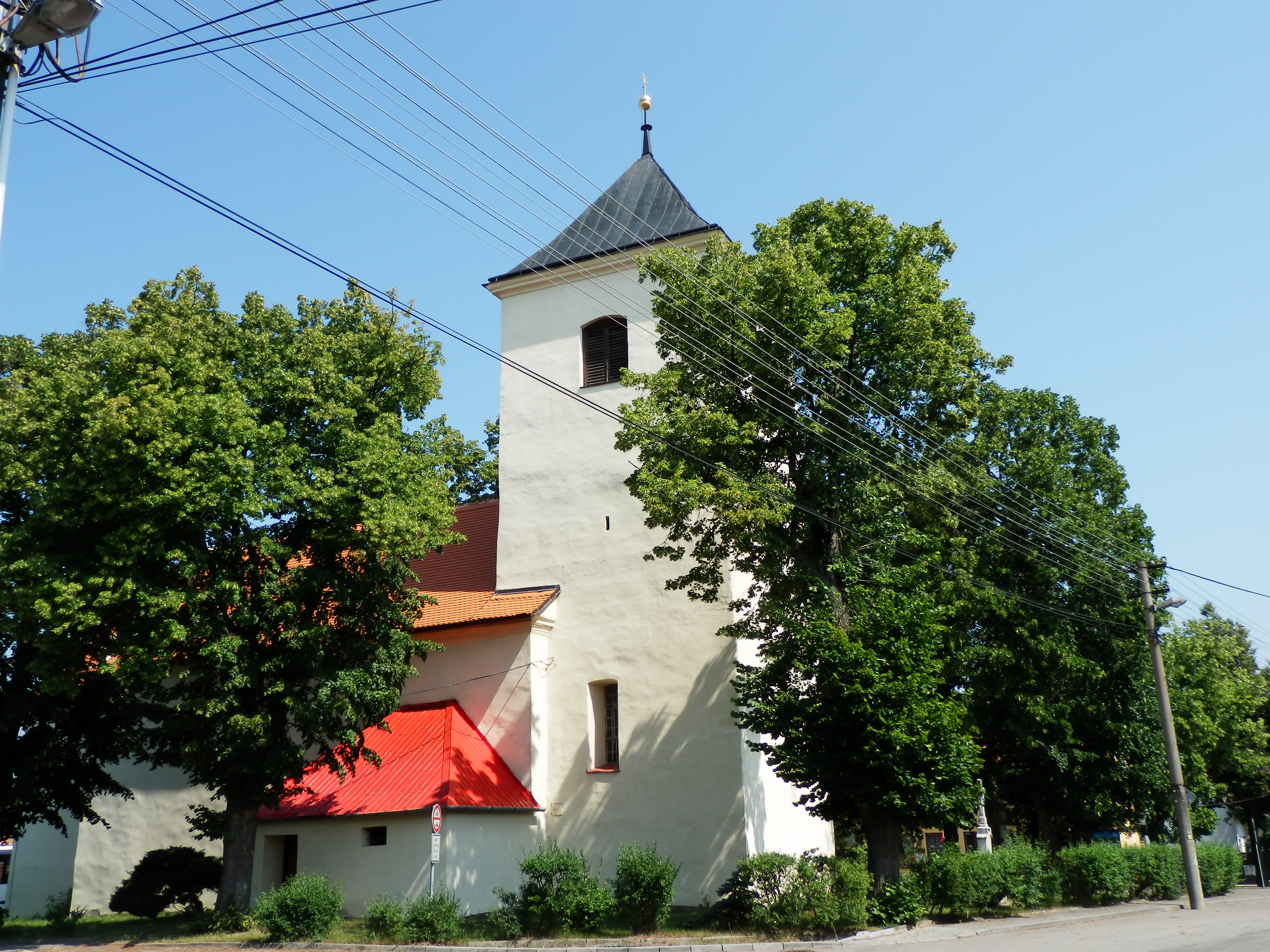
- Church of the Assumption of the Virgin Mary

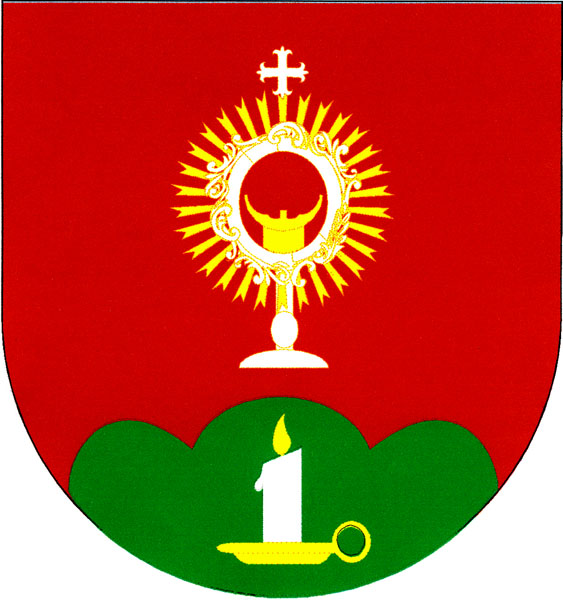
- Flag Coat of arms

- Location in the Czech Republic
- Coordinates: 49°18′6″N 16°18′32″E
- Country: Czech Republic
- Region: South Moravian
- District: Brno-Country
- First mentioned: 1240

Area
  - Total: 8.48 km^{2} (3.27 sq mi)
- Elevation: 482 m (1,581 ft)

Population (2026-01-01)
  - Total: 459
  - Density: 54.1/km^{2} (140/sq mi)
- Time zone: UTC+1 (CET)
  - Summer (DST): UTC+2 (CEST)
- Postal code: 666 01
- Website: www.svatoslav.cz

Svatoslav is a municipality and village in Brno-Country District in the South Moravian Region of the Czech Republic. It has about 500 inhabitants.

Svatoslav lies approximately 26 kilometres (16 mi) north-west of Brno and 162 km (101 mi) south-east of Prague.

== Demographics ==
Historical population
Year	Pop.	±%
1869	637	—
1880	680	+6.8%
1890	652	−4.1%
1900	652	+0.0%
1910	698	+7.1%
1921	682	−2.3%
1930	662	−2.9%
1950	524	−20.8%
1961	523	−0.2%
1970	541	+3.4%
1980	477	−11.8%
1991	444	−6.9%
2001	438	−1.4%
2011	425	−3.0%
2021	433	+1.9%
Source: Censuses
