= Mirakowo =

- Village
- Location within Poland
- Coordinates: 53°9′13″N 18°41′25″E
- Country: Poland
- Voivodeship: Kuyavian-Pomeranian
- County: Toruń
- Gmina: Chełmża

Mirakowo [miraˈkɔvɔ] is a village in the administrative district of Gmina Chełmża, within Toruń County, Kuyavian-Pomeranian Voivodeship, in north-central Poland.
