= Pluskowęsy, Toruń County =

Pluskowęsy
- Village
- Location within Poland
- Coordinates: 53°11′9″N 18°39′24″E
- Country: Poland
- Voivodeship: Kuyavian-Pomeranian
- County: Toruń
- Gmina: Chełmża

Pluskowęsy [pluskɔˈvɛ̃sɨ] is a village in the administrative district of Gmina Chełmża, within Toruń County, Kuyavian-Pomeranian Voivodeship, in north-central Poland.
