= Świętosław, Toruń County =

Świętosław
- Village
- Location within Poland
- Coordinates: 53°13′39″N 18°44′41″E
- Country: Poland
- Voivodeship: Kuyavian-Pomeranian
- County: Toruń
- Gmina: Chełmża

Świętosław (Polish: [ɕfjɛnˈtɔswaf]) is a village in the administrative district of Gmina Chełmża, within Toruń County, Kuyavian-Pomeranian Voivodeship, in north-central Poland.
