= Świętosław =

Świętosław (IPA: [ɕfjɛnˈtɔswaf]) or Światosław (IPA: [ɕfjaˈtɔswaf]) is a Slavic name used in Poland, meaning: święt (holy, strong) and sław (glory, famous). Feminine form is: Świętosława.

== See also ==
- Sviatoslav, an East Slavic cognate
- Polish names
