= Regina Basilier =

- Born: Regina Kleinfeldt; 1572; Gdańsk, Kingdom of Poland
- Died: 1631 (aged 58–59); Stockholm, Swedish Empire
- Occupation(s): merchant, moneylender

Regina Basilier (née Kleinfeldt 1572–1631), was a Swedish (born in Poland) merchant and moneylender. She is known as a banker of king Gustavus Adolphus of Sweden.

== Biography ==
She was born in Danzig (which was then part of the Polish-Lithuanian Commonwealth) to councillor Reinhold Kleinfeldt and Regina Von Schachtmann (great-great granddaughter to Łukasz Watzenrode, The Elder) and married to the Hamburg merchant Adam Basilier (d. 1608), who was a significant creditor of the Swedish prince John, Duke of Östergötland.

Upon the death of Prince John in 1618, she emigrated to Sweden to protect her interests. She acquired the estates Kungs Norrby in Östergötland as well as Gripsholm, Vibyholm, and Åkers in Södermanland, from the crown as leasehold estates. Regina Basilier was one of the greatest creditors of the Swedish royal house and often provided the crown with financial loans as well as supplies from her Swedish leasehold estates. She also continued a lucrative trading import business of textiles and jewelry and was a provider of such luxury items to the Swedish royal family. She is, for example, recorded to have sold bed draperies to Christina of Holstein-Gottorp, wallpaper to Gustavus Adolphus of Sweden, and jewelry for Maria Eleonora of Brandenburg.

She died as the perhaps greatest creditor of the crown and one of the most successful and influential merchants in Sweden. She left her business interests to her only child, Nikolaus Gustaf Basilier (ca. 1595-1663)
