= Dźwierzno, Kuyavian-Pomeranian Voivodeship =

Dźwierzno
- Village
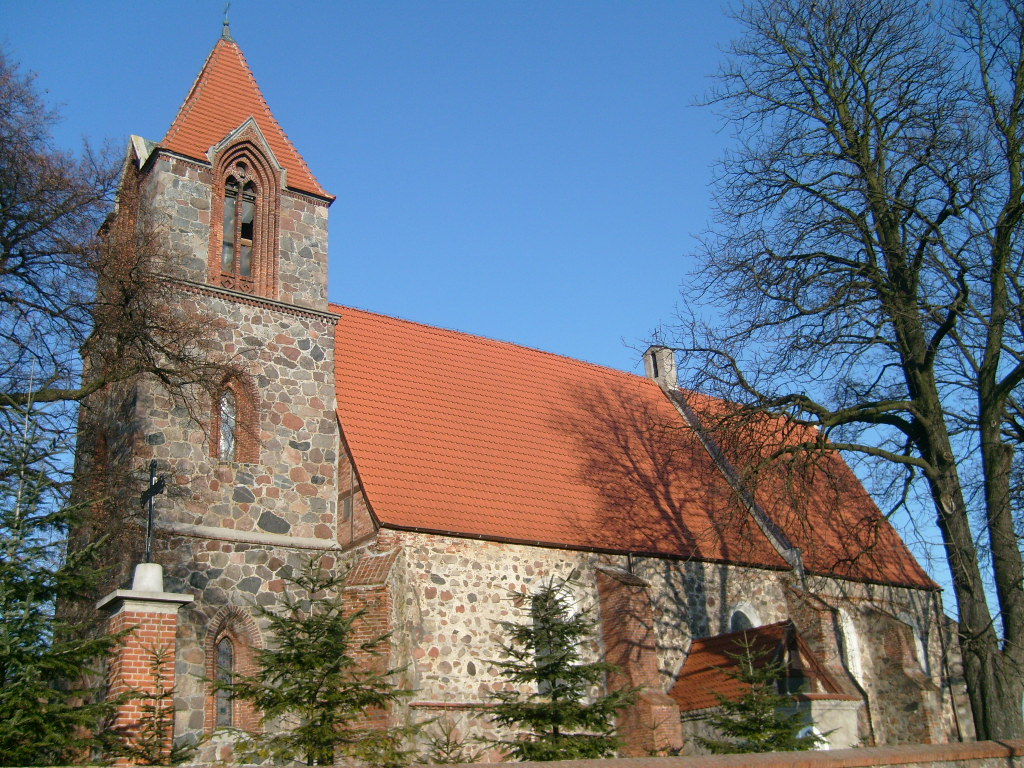
- Parish Church of The Assumption of the Blessed Virgin Mary, built about year 1300.

- Location within Poland
- Coordinates: 53°12′32″N 18°43′52″E
- Country: Poland
- Voivodeship: Kuyavian-Pomeranian
- County: Toruń
- Gmina: Chełmża
- Population: 480

Dźwierzno [ˈd͡ʑvjɛʐnɔ] is a village in the administrative district of Gmina Chełmża, within Toruń County, Kuyavian-Pomeranian Voivodeship, in north-central Poland.
