= Chwarzno, Kościerzyna County =

Chwarzno
- Village
- Location within Poland
- Coordinates: 53°58′16″N 18°11′9″E
- Country: Poland
- Voivodeship: Pomeranian
- County: Kościerzyna
- Gmina: Stara Kiszewa
- Population: 184

Chwarzno [ˈxfaʐnɔ] is a village in the administrative district of Gmina Stara Kiszewa, within Kościerzyna County, Pomeranian Voivodeship, in northern Poland.

For details of the history of the region, see History of Pomerania.
