= Svetoslav =

Svetoslav is a given name. Notable people with the name include:

- Svetoslav of Croatia (before 997 - 1000), king of Croatia
- Svetoslav Dyakov (born 1984), Bulgarian football midfielder
- Svetoslav Georgiev (born 1977), Bulgarian football player
- Svetoslav Minkov (1902–1966), Bulgarian writer
- Svetoslav Petrov (footballer born 1978), former Bulgarian football midfielder
- Svetoslav Petrov (footballer born 1988), Bulgarian football midfielder for Lokomotiv Sofia
- Svetoslav Stoyanov (born 1976), badminton player from France
- Svetoslav Roerich (1904–1993), Russian painter
- Svetoslav Todorov (born 1978), Bulgarian international footballer
- Svetoslav Vitkov (born 1971), Bulgarian singer

== See also ==
- Sviatoslav
