= Sviatoslav =

- Gender: Male

Origin
- Origin: Slavic languages
- Meaning: 'Holy worshipper', 'Bright glory'
- Region of origin: Eastern Europe

Other names
- Nicknames: Svetlyo (Bulgarian), Slava (Russian), Świętek (Polish), Slavik (Ukrainian), Svet (Bulgarian and Russian), Sviat (Ukrainian)
- Related names: Svetoslav, Svatoslav, Świętosław, Svetislav

Sviatoslav (Russian: Святосла́в, romanized: Svjatosláv, IPA: [sʲvʲɪtɐˈslaf]; Ukrainian: Святосла́в, romanized: Svjatosláv, IPA: [sʲwʲɐtoˈslɑu̯]) is a Russian and Ukrainian given name of Slavic origin. Cognates include Svetoslav, Svatoslav, Świętosław, Svetislav. It has a Pre-Christian pagan character and means 'one who worships the light' (likely in reference to the sun). In Christian times the name's meaning started to be associated with the Proto-Slavic roots *svętъ (holy, light, world) and *slava (glory), to be explained as 'one who worships the Holy'. A diminutive form for Sviatoslav is Svetlyo (Bulgarian), Slava (Russian), Świętek (Polish), Slavko, Sveto, Svet, Sviat, Sviatko (Ukrainian). Its feminine form is Sviatoslava. The name may refer to:

== People ==
=== Monarchs ===
- Sviatoslav I of Kiev (c. 943 – 972), prince of Kiev and Novgorod
- Sviatoslav II of Kiev (1027–1076), prince of Kiev and Chernigov
- Sviatoslav III of Kiev (before 1141–1194), prince of Turov (1142 and 1154), Vladimir and Volyn (1141–1146), Pinsk (1154), Novgorod-Seversky (1157–1164), Chernigov (1164–1177), Grand Prince of Kiev (1174, 1177–1180, 1182–1194)
- Sviatoslav Olgovich (before 1108–1164), prince of Novgorod-Severski (1136–1138, 1139), Belgorod (1141–1154) and Chernigov (1154–1164)
- Sviatoslav III of Vladimir (1196–1252), prince of Vladimir and Novgorod

=== Sports ===
- Svyatoslav Syrota (born 1970), Ukrainian sport administrator and former player

=== Other ===
- Svyatoslav Fyodorov (1927–2000), Russian ophthalmologist
- Sviatoslav Piskun (born 1959), Ukrainian statesman
- Sviatoslav Richter (1915–1997), Russian pianist
- Sviatoslav Vakarchuk (born 1975), Ukrainian singer
- Sviatoslav Shevchuk (born 1970), Ukrainian Catholic Patriarchate of Kyiv

== See also ==
- Slavic names
