= Expressway S10 (Poland) =

Road in Poland

Coordinates: 52°58′22″N 18°42′01″E

Expressway S10
- Droga ekspresowa S10

Route information
- Length: 56 km (35 mi) 460 km (286 mi) planned

Major junctions
- From: A 6 near Szczecin

- S 11 near Piła (planned); S 5 near Bydgoszcz; A 1 near Toruń

- To: S 50 near Płock

Location
- Country: Poland
- Regions: West Pomeranian Voivodeship, Kuyavian-Pomeranian Voivodeship, Masovian Voivodeship
- Major cities: Szczecin, Bydgoszcz, Toruń

Highway system
- National roads in Poland; Voivodeship roads
← S 8	→ S 11

Expressway S10 or express road S10 (in Polish droga ekspresowa S10) is a Polish highway which, when completed, will serve as a direct route between Szczecin and Warsaw. It has been planned to run from the interchange with Motorway A6 on the eastern outskirts of Szczecin, through Bydgoszcz and Toruń, to the interchange with express road S50 near Płock, west of Warsaw. Its planned length is 460 km (290 mi).

As of 2024, only short stretches of S10 serving as bypasses of Bydgoszcz, Toruń and several smaller towns have been built, totalling about 56 km (35 mi). According to the plans, the road from Bydgoszcz to Toruń will be constructed by 2026, from Szczecin to Bydgoszcz – by 2030, and from Toruń to Warsaw – by 2032.

== Route ==
Section	Planned completion	Notes
Szczecin (A6) – Stargard (including bypass of Stargard)	2028	Completed as a dual-carriageway road, mostly in the expressway standard. Two intersections remain at-grade, planned to get reconstructed to full expressway standard by 2028.
Stargard – Piła (S11)	2028	Design-build contracts ongoing. Wałcz bypass completed.
Piła – Bydgoszcz (S5)	2030	Preparatory works. 1st carriageway of Wyrzysk bypass completed. 1st carriageway of Piła bypass completed with at-grade intersections and traffic lights (to be reconstructed during the addition of the 2nd carriageway).
Bydgoszcz – Toruń (A1)	2026	Under construction. Bydgoszcz bypass completed. 1st carriageway of Toruń bypass completed.
Toruń – Włocławek	2013	Concurrency with
Włocławek (A1) – Płock – Warsaw (S50)	2032	Preparatory works. Until S10 is completed, the primary transit route between Toruń and Warsaw is via motorways A1 and A2.

== Exit List ==
Country	Voivodeship	Location	km	mi	Exit	Name	Destinations	Notes
Poland	West Pomeranian Voivodeship	Szczecin			1	Szczecin Kijewo interchange	A 6 / E28 – Gdańsk/Berlin S 3 / E65 – Gorzów Wielkopolski/Świnoujście/Solidarity Szczecin–Goleniów Airport; DK 10 – Szczecin/Lubieszyn	proposed western endpoint of expressway Kilometrage starting point cloverleaf interchange currently signed as DK 10
Poland	West Pomeranian Voivodeship	Szczecin			—	Kijewo — city limits of Szczecin section	Szczecin-Płonia/Szczecin Zdunowo	section planned pending environmental decision
Poland	West Pomeranian Voivodeship	Szczecin			—	transition from national road	DK 10	Western endpoint of expressway section
Poland	West Pomeranian Voivodeship	Gmina Kobylanka			4	Kobylanka	DW 120 — Kobylanka/Gryfino/Motaniec	
Poland	West Pomeranian Voivodeship	Gmina Stargard			5	Stargard Zachód	Stargard/Kobylanka	Incomplete junction: no entry ramp Kobylanka → Szczecin Zachód means west
Poland	West Pomeranian Voivodeship	Stargard			6	Stargard Południe	DW 106 — Stargard/Pyrzyce	Południe means south
Poland	West Pomeranian Voivodeship	Gmina Stargard			7	Stargard Wschód	DK 20 — Stargard	Wschód means east
Poland	West Pomeranian Voivodeship	Gmina Stargard			—	transition to national road	DK 10	Eastern endpoint of expressway section
Poland	West Pomeranian Voivodeship	Gmina Stargard			8	Krąpiel	Krąpiel	exit planned as part of Stargard — Recz section
Poland	West Pomeranian Voivodeship	Gmina Suchań			9	Suchań	DW 160 — Suchań/Choszczno	exit planned as part of Stargard — Recz section
Poland	West Pomeranian Voivodeship	Gmina Recz			10	Recz	DW 151 — Świdwin/Recz/Choszczno	exit planned as part of Stargard — Recz section
Poland	West Pomeranian Voivodeship	Gmina Drawno			11	Żołwino	Żołwino	exit planned as part of Recz — Mirosławiec section
Poland	West Pomeranian Voivodeship	Gmina Kalisz Pomorski			12	Cybowo	Cybowo	exit planned as part of Recz — Mirosławiec section
Poland	West Pomeranian Voivodeship	Gmina Kalisz Pomorski			13	Kalisz Pomorski	DW 175 — Drawsko Pomorskie/Kalisz Pomorski/Choszczno	exit planned as part of Recz — Mirosławiec section
Poland	West Pomeranian Voivodeship	Gmina Mirosławiec			14	Łowicz Wałecki	Łowicz Wałecki	exit planned as part of Recz — Mirosławiec section
Poland	West Pomeranian Voivodeship	Gmina Mirosławiec			15	Mirosławiec	DW 177 — Czaplinek/Mirosławiec/Wieleń	exit planned as part of Mirosławiec bypass
Poland	West Pomeranian Voivodeship	Gmina Mirosławiec			16	Piecnik	Piecnik	exit planned as part of Mirosławiec — Wałcz section
Poland	West Pomeranian Voivodeship	Wałcz			—	transition from national road	DK 10	Western endpoint of expressway section
Poland	West Pomeranian Voivodeship	Wałcz			17	Wałcz Zachód	Wałcz	Incomplete junction: no exit ramp Bydgoszcz → Wałcz; no entry ramp Wałcz → Bydgoszcz Zachód means west
Poland	West Pomeranian Voivodeship	Wałcz			18	Wałcz Północ	DW 163 — Wałcz/Kołobrzeg/Gorzów Wielkopolski	Północ means north
Poland	West Pomeranian Voivodeship	Wałcz			19	Wałcz Wschód	DK 22 — Wałcz/Gorzów Wielkopolski/Człuchów	Wschód means east
Poland	West Pomeranian Voivodeship	Gmina Wałcz			20	Witankowo	Nowa Szwecja/Skrzatusz/Witankowo	
Poland	West Pomeranian Voivodeship	Gmina Wałcz			—	transition to national road	DK 10	Eastern endpoint of expressway section
Poland	Greater Poland Voivodeship	Gmina Szydłowo			21	Stara Łubianka	Stara Łubianka	exit planned as part of Wałcz — Piła section
Poland	Greater Poland Voivodeship	Piła			—	Piła bypass	S 11/Piła	concurrency with Expressway S11 planned section planned as part of Expressway S11 pending environmental decision
Poland	Greater Poland Voivodeship	—			—	Piła — Wyrzysk section	Białośliwie	section planned pending environmental decision
Poland	Greater Poland Voivodeship	Gmina Wyrzysk			—	transition from national road	DK 10	Western endpoint of expressway section
Poland	Greater Poland Voivodeship	Gmina Wyrzysk			27	Wyrzysk Zachód	DW 242 — Więcbork/Gołańcz/Wyrzysk	Zachód means west
Poland	Greater Poland Voivodeship	Gmina Wyrzysk			28	Wyrzysk Wschód	Wyrzysk	Wschód means east
Poland	Greater Poland Voivodeship	Gmina Wyrzysk			—	transition to national road	DK 10	Eastern endpoint of expressway section
Poland	Kuyavian-Pomeranian Voivodeship	—			—	Wyrzysk — Bydgoszcz section	Nakło nad Notecią	section planned pending environmental decision
Poland	Kuyavian-Pomeranian Voivodeship	Gmina Sicienko			—	transition from national road	DK 10	Western endpoint of expressway section
Poland	Kuyavian-Pomeranian Voivodeship	Gmina Sicienko			34	Bydgoszcz Zachód interchange	S 5 / E261 — Gdańsk; DK 25 — Koszalin; DK 80 — Bydgoszcz	Western End of concurrency with Expressway S5 Western End of concurrency with national road 25 modified cloverleaf interchange Zachód means west
Poland	Kuyavian-Pomeranian Voivodeship	Gmina Białe Błota			13	Bydgoszcz Miedzyń	Bydgoszcz—Miedzyń/Nakło	Exit number part of Expressway S5
Poland	Kuyavian-Pomeranian Voivodeship	Gmina Białe Błota			35	Bydgoszcz Błonie interchange	S 5 / E261 — Poznań DW 223 — Bydgoszcz-Centrum	Eastern End of concurrency with Expressway S5 cloverleaf interchange Centrum means center
Poland	Kuyavian-Pomeranian Voivodeship	Gmina Białe Błota			36	Bydgoszcz Południe	DK 25 — Konin; Bydgoszcz Ignacy Jan Paderewski Airport	Eastern End of concurrency with national road 25 Południe means south
Poland	Kuyavian-Pomeranian Voivodeship	Gmina Białe Błota			—	transition to national road	DK 10	Eastern endpoint of expressway section
Poland	Kuyavian-Pomeranian Voivodeship	Bydgoszcz			37	Bydgoszcz Emilianowo	Bydgoszcz-Emilianowo	exit under construction as part of Bydgoszcz Południe — Bydgoszcz Emilianowo section
Poland	Kuyavian-Pomeranian Voivodeship	Gmina Solec Kujawski			38	Bydgoszcz Makowiska	DW 397 — Bydgoszcz/Solec Kujawski	exit under construction as part of Bydgoszcz Emilianowo — Solec section
Poland	Kuyavian-Pomeranian Voivodeship	Gmina Solec Kujawski			39	Solec	DW 249 — Solec Kujawski	exit under construction as part of Solec — Toruń Zachód section
Poland	Kuyavian-Pomeranian Voivodeship	Gmina Wielka Nieszawka			—	transition from national road	DK 10	Western endpoint of expressway section
Poland	Kuyavian-Pomeranian Voivodeship	Gmina Wielka Nieszawka			40	Toruń Zachód	DK 15 — Toruń/Olsztyn/Poznań	Western endpoint of expressway section Zachód means west
Poland	Kuyavian-Pomeranian Voivodeship	Toruń			41	Toruń Podgórz	Toruń Podgórz	exit planned
Poland	Kuyavian-Pomeranian Voivodeship	Gmina Wielka Nieszawka			42	Toruń Czerniewice	DK 91 — Toruń/Włocławek	exit planned
Poland	Kuyavian-Pomeranian Voivodeship	Gmina Wielka Nieszawka			43	Toruń Południe interchange	A 1 / E75 — Łódź	Western End of concurrency with A1 autostrada trumpet interchange Południe means south
Poland	Kuyavian-Pomeranian Voivodeship	Vistula River			—	Bridge over the Vistula River	—	
Poland	Kuyavian-Pomeranian Voivodeship	Gmina Lubicz			—	PPO Nowa Wieś	—	Western terminus of toll section PPO means toll station
Poland	Kuyavian-Pomeranian Voivodeship	Gmina Lubicz			44	Lubicz interchange	A 1 / E75 — Gdańsk; DK 80 — Toruń	Eastern End of concurrency with A1 autostrada Eastern terminus of toll section interchange equipped with toll station double trumpet interchange
Poland	Kuyavian-Pomeranian Voivodeship	Gmina Lubicz			—	transition to national road	DK 10	Eastern endpoint of expressway section
Poland	Kuyavian-Pomeranian Voivodeship	—			—	Toruń — Border with Masovian Voivodeship section	Włocławek	section in early planning stage
Poland	Masovian Voivodeship	—			—	Border with Masovian Voivodeship — greater Warsaw bypass section	Płock	section in early planning stage
1.000 mi = 1.609 km; 1.000 km = 0.621 mi: Concurrency terminus; Incomplete access; Proposed; Tolled; Route transition

== See also ==
- Highways in Poland
