= Jabłonowo, Wałcz County =

Jabłonowo
- Village
- Location within Poland
- Coordinates: 53°19′53″N 16°17′48″E
- Country: Poland
- Voivodeship: West Pomeranian
- County: Wałcz
- Gmina: Mirosławiec
- Population: 180

Jabłonowo [jabwɔˈnɔvɔ] (German: Appelwerder) is a village in the administrative district of Gmina Mirosławiec, within Wałcz County, West Pomeranian Voivodeship, in north-western Poland. It lies approximately 14 km (9 mi) east of Mirosławiec, 14 km (9 mi) north-west of Wałcz, and 115 km (71 mi) east of the regional capital Szczecin.

For the history of the region, see History of Pomerania.

The village has a population of 180.
