= Krobia (disambiguation) =

Krobia may refer to:

== Places ==
- Krobia in Greater Poland Voivodeship (west-central Poland)
- Krobia, Kuyavian-Pomeranian Voivodeship (north-central Poland)
- Krobia, Masovian Voivodeship (east-central Poland)

== Biology ==
- Krobia – a genus of cichlid fish from South America
