= Próchnowo, West Pomeranian Voivodeship =

Próchnowo
- Village
- Location within Poland
- Coordinates: 53°18′40″N 16°14′23″E
- Country: Poland
- Voivodeship: West Pomeranian
- County: Wałcz
- Gmina: Mirosławiec
- Population: 210

Próchnowo [pruxˈnɔvɔ] (German: Prochnow) is a village in the administrative district of Gmina Mirosławiec, within Wałcz County, West Pomeranian Voivodeship, in north-western Poland. It lies approximately 11 km (7 mi) east of Mirosławiec, 16 km (10 mi) west of Wałcz, and 111 km (69 mi) east of the regional capital Szczecin.

For the history of the region, see History of Pomerania.

The village has a population of 210.
