= Toporzyk, Wałcz County =

Toporzyk
- Village
- Location within Poland
- Coordinates: 53°22′N 16°13′E
- Country: Poland
- Voivodeship: West Pomeranian
- County: Wałcz
- Gmina: Mirosławiec

Toporzyk [tɔˈpɔʐɨk] is a village in the administrative district of Gmina Mirosławiec, within Wałcz County, West Pomeranian Voivodeship, in north-western Poland. It lies approximately 9 km (6 mi) east of Mirosławiec, 20 km (12 mi) north-west of Wałcz, and 109 km (68 mi) east of the regional capital Szczecin.

For the history of the region, see History of Pomerania.
