= Jabłonkowo =

- Village
- Location within Poland
- Coordinates: 53°19′52″N 16°16′41″E
- Country: Poland
- Voivodeship: West Pomeranian
- County: Wałcz
- Gmina: Mirosławiec
- Population: 180

Jabłonkowo [jabwɔnˈkɔvɔ] is a village in the administrative district of Gmina Mirosławiec, within Wałcz County, West Pomeranian Voivodeship, in north-western Poland. It lies approximately 13 km (8 mi) east of Mirosławiec, 15 km (9 mi) north-west of Wałcz, and 113 km (70 mi) east of the regional capital Szczecin.

For the history of the region, see History of Pomerania.

The village has a population of 180.
