= Drzewoszewo =

- Village
- Location within Poland
- Coordinates: 53°18′18″N 16°16′10″E
- Country: Poland
- Voivodeship: West Pomeranian
- County: Wałcz
- Gmina: Mirosławiec

Drzewoszewo [dʐɛvɔˈʂɛvɔ] is a village in the administrative district of Gmina Mirosławiec, within Wałcz County, West Pomeranian Voivodeship, in north-western Poland. It lies approximately 13 km (8 mi) east of Mirosławiec, 14 km (9 mi) west of Wałcz, and 113 km (70 mi) east of the regional capital Szczecin.

For the history of the region, see History of Pomerania.
