= Brzoza, Toruń County =

Brzoza
- Village
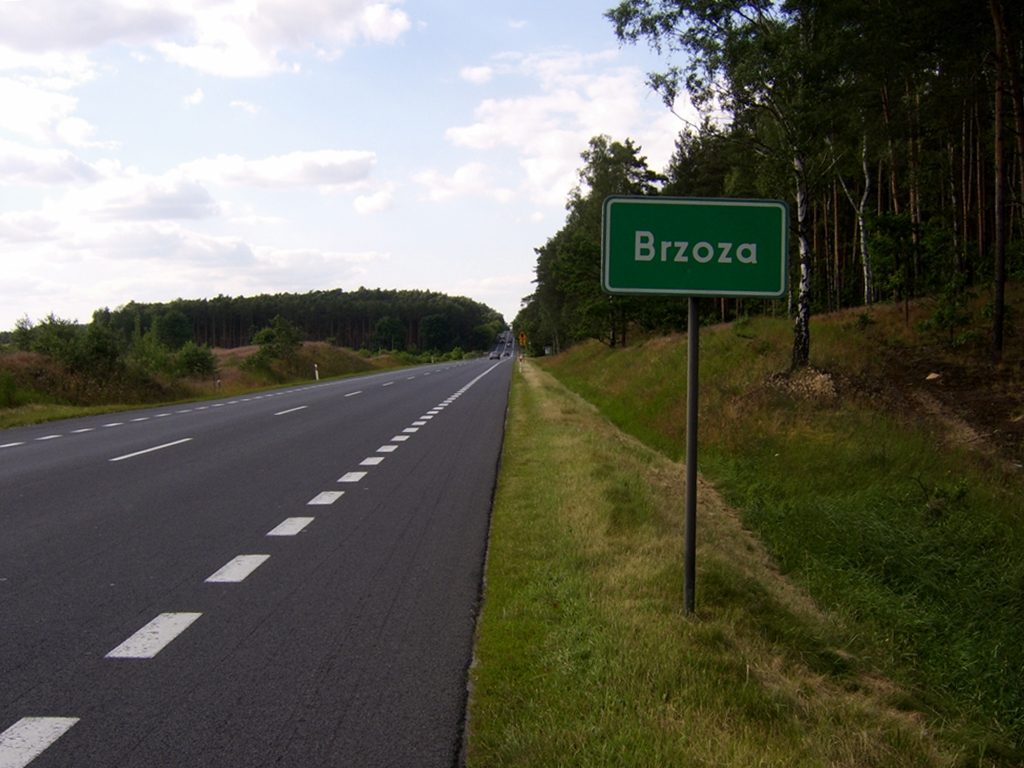
- Entrance to the village

- Location within Poland
- Coordinates: 52°57′43″N 18°41′20″E
- Country: Poland
- Voivodeship: Kuyavian-Pomeranian
- County: Toruń
- Gmina: Wielka Nieszawka
- Population: 180
- Time zone: UTC+1 (CET)
  - Summer (DST): UTC+2 (CEST)
- Vehicle registration: CTR

Brzoza [ˈbʐɔza], meaning birch, is a village in the administrative district of Gmina Wielka Nieszawka, within Toruń County, Kuyavian-Pomeranian Voivodeship, in north-central Poland. It is located in the historic region of Kuyavia.

== History ==
During the German occupation of Poland (World War II), in 1939, the local Polish school principal was murdered by the Germans in a massacre of Poles committed in the nearby Barbarka forest in Toruń as part of the Intelligenzaktion. In November 1940, the German Schutzpolizei carried out expulsions of Poles, who were placed in a transit camp in Toruń, and then either deported to the General Government in the more eastern part of German-occupied Poland or sent to forced labour, while their houses and farms were handed over to German colonists as part of the Lebensraum policy.

== Transport ==
Brzoza is located at the intersection of the Polish A1 and S10 highways, and also the National road 91 passes through the village. There is also a railway station in the village.
