= Kakol =

Kakol may refer to:

- Kakol, Iran
- Kakol, Abbottabad, Pakistan
- Kąkol, Kuyavian-Pomeranian Voivodeship, Poland
