= Expressway S47 (Poland) =

Unbuilt expressway in Poland

Expressway S47
- Droga ekspresowa S47

Route information
- Time period: 2001–2003 (planned only)

Major junctions
- From: Rabka-Zdrój
- To: Zakopane

Location
- Country: Poland
- Regions: Lesser Poland Voivodeship

Highway system
- National roads in Poland; Voivodeship roads
← S 22	→ S 50

Expressway S47 (Polish: Droga ekspresowa S47, abbreviated as S47) – former planned expressway in Poland on the stretch of national road 47 between Rabka-Zdrój and Zakopane.

== History ==
The road was included in the Regulation of the Council of Ministers of September 29, 2001 as a new expressway planned on the entire course of the existing national road 47. The project had been heavily criticised by the inhabitants of villages located near the route.

With the next regulation, published in 2003, the expressway has been cancelled and will not be constructed.
