= Bronikowo, West Pomeranian Voivodeship =

Bronikowo
- Village
- Location within Poland
- Coordinates: 53°18′N 16°11′E
- Country: Poland
- Voivodeship: West Pomeranian
- County: Wałcz
- Gmina: Mirosławiec

Bronikowo [brɔniˈkɔvɔ] (German: Brunk) is a village in the administrative district of Gmina Mirosławiec, within Wałcz County, West Pomeranian Voivodeship, in north-western Poland. It lies approximately 9 km (6 mi) south-east of Mirosławiec, 20 km (12 mi) west of Wałcz, and 108 km (67 mi) east of the regional capital Szczecin.

For the history of the region, see History of Pomerania.
