= Hanki =

- Village
- Location within Poland
- Coordinates: 53°19′N 16°9′E
- Country: Poland
- Voivodeship: West Pomeranian
- County: Wałcz
- Gmina: Mirosławiec

Hanki [ˈxanki] (German: Henkendorf) is a village in the administrative district of Gmina Mirosławiec, within Wałcz County, West Pomeranian Voivodeship, in north-western Poland. It lies approximately 6 km (4 mi) south-east of Mirosławiec, 22 km (14 mi) west of Wałcz, and 105 km (65 mi) east of the regional capital Szczecin.

For the history of the region, see History of Pomerania.
