= Chorągiewka =

- Village
- Location within Poland
- Coordinates: 52°56′33″N 18°31′3″E
- Country: Poland
- Voivodeship: Kuyavian-Pomeranian
- County: Toruń
- Gmina: Wielka Nieszawka

Chorągiewka [xɔrɔnˈɡʲɛfka] is a village in the administrative district of Gmina Wielka Nieszawka, within Toruń County, Kuyavian-Pomeranian Voivodeship, in north-central Poland.
