= 12th Unmanned Aerial Vehicles Base =

Polish Air Force base

- Near Mirosławiec in Poland

Site information
- Operator: Polish Air Force
- Condition: Operational

Location
- Location 12BBSP (Poland)
- Coordinates: 53°23′41″N 16°04′59″E

Airfield information
- Identifiers: ICAO: EPMI
- Elevation: 495 feet (151 m) AMSL
Runways
Direction	Length and surface
12/30	8,202 feet (2,500 m)

The 12 Baza Bezzałogowych Statków Powietrznych (English: 12th Unmanned Aerial Vehicles Base) is a Polish Air Force base, located 5 km north of Mirosławiec.

It was constituted as 12 Baza Lotnicza on 1 January 2001.

In 2008, it was the site of the 2008 Polish Air Force C-295 Mirosławiec crash.
