= Mierzynek, Kuyavian-Pomeranian Voivodeship =

Mierzynek
- Village
- Location within Poland
- Coordinates: 53°2′18″N 18°48′15″E
- Country: Poland
- Voivodeship: Kuyavian-Pomeranian
- County: Toruń
- Gmina: Lubicz

Mierzynek [mjɛˈʐɨnɛk] is a village in the administrative district of Gmina Lubicz, within Toruń County, Kuyavian-Pomeranian Voivodeship, in north-central Poland.
