= Kalinówka, West Pomeranian Voivodeship =

Kalinówka
- Village
- Location within Poland
- Coordinates: 53°20′57″N 16°06′54″E
- Country: Poland
- Voivodeship: West Pomeranian
- County: Wałcz
- Gmina: Mirosławiec
- Population: 42

Kalinówka [kaliˈnufka] is a village in the administrative district of Gmina Mirosławiec, within Wałcz County, West Pomeranian Voivodeship, in north-western Poland.

For the history of the region, see History of Pomerania.

The village has a population of 42.
