= Gronowo, Kuyavian-Pomeranian Voivodeship =

Gronowo
- Village
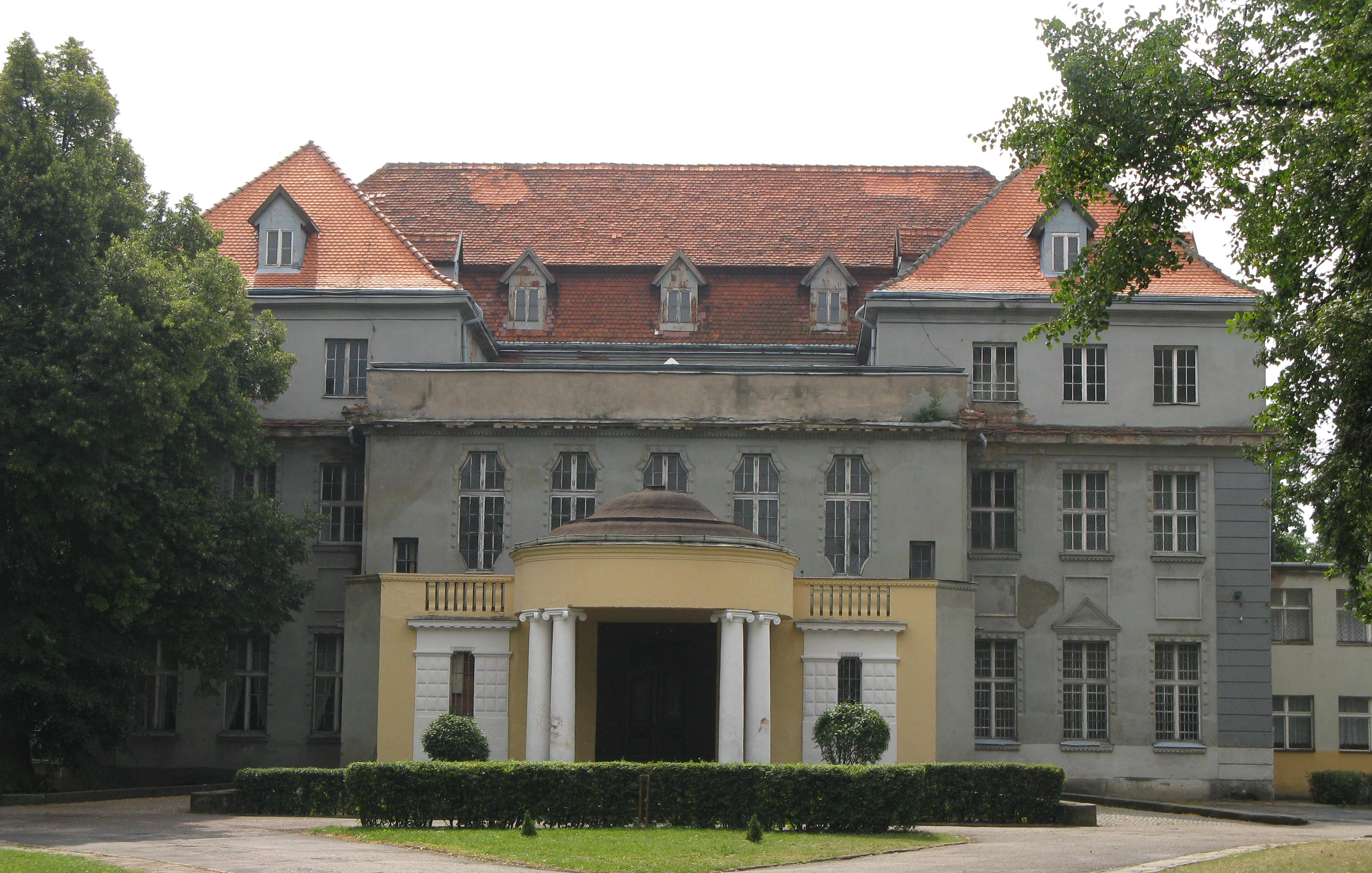
- Wolff Family Palace

- Location within Poland
- Coordinates: 53°6′10″N 18°47′24″E
- Country: Poland
- Voivodeship: Kuyavian-Pomeranian
- County: Toruń
- Gmina: Lubicz
- Population: 700

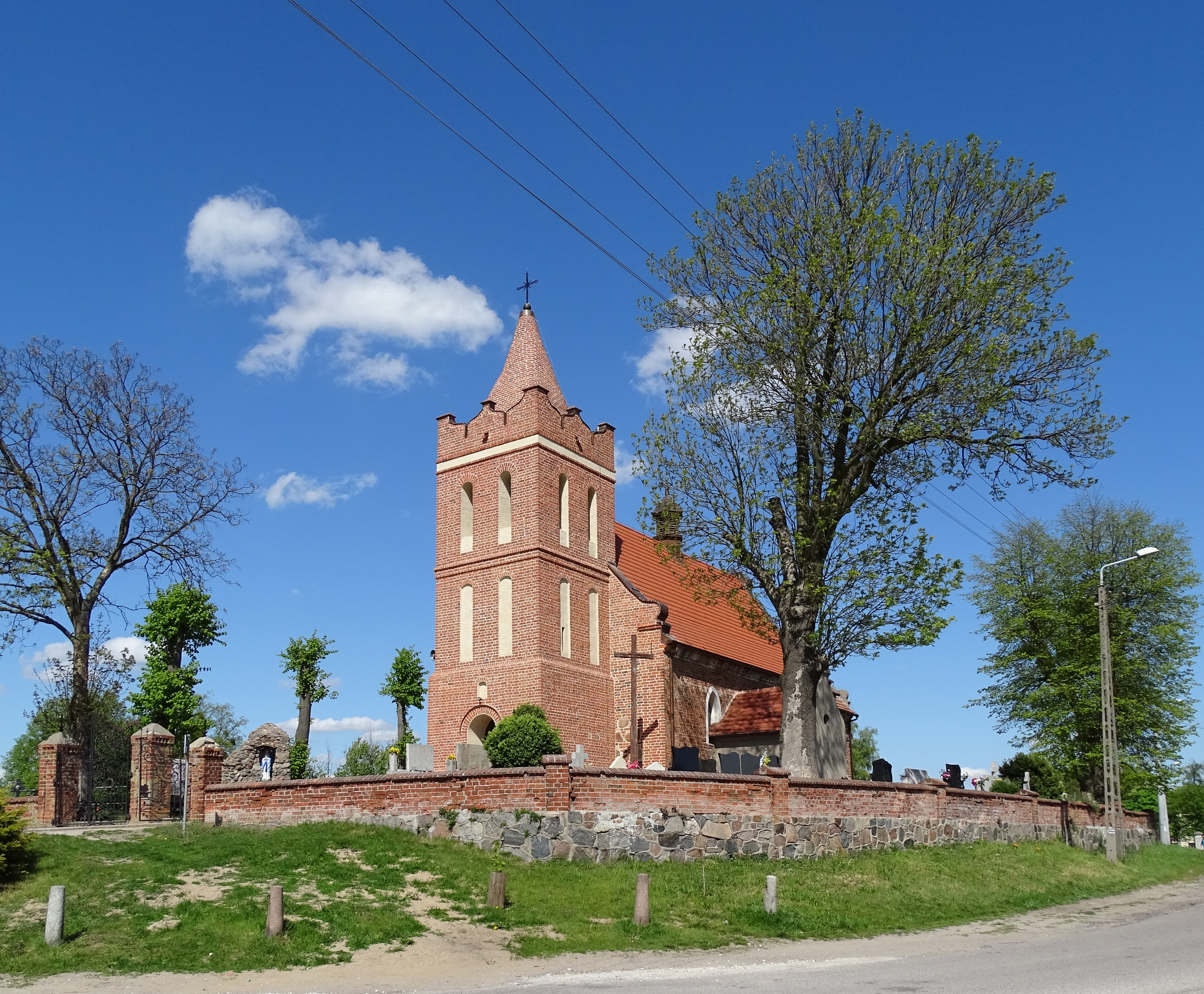
Parish church

Gronowo [ɡrɔˈnɔvɔ] is a village in the administrative district of Gmina Lubicz, within Toruń County, Kuyavian-Pomeranian Voivodeship, in north-central Poland.

== History ==
The village was founded in 1412. Beginning in 1437 the village was owned by the Teutonic Order, and helped support the garrison in Toruń. In the Second Peace of Thorn (1466) ownership passed to the Polish king as crownlands. The king mortgaged the property and from 1520 to 1570 Gronowo was briefly owned by the city council of Toruń. In 1570 it again became a royal holding and in 1639 King Władysław IV enfeeoffed the land, and it then passed through the hands of various noble families. In 1798 the owner was Samuel Wolff of Gronowa. The current Wolffów Palace was built about 1910 replacing an earlier one. In 1920 the Wolff estates were acquired by Prince Władysław (Vladimir Puzyna).

=== Monuments ===
- Wolff Family Palace and gardens: The gardens date from the mid 19th century, while the palace was completely rebuilt about 1910.
- Wolff Family Chapel and Mausoleum was built in the family graveyard in 1860 and has not been restored.
- St. Nicholas gothic church dates from the 14th century, but has been modified considerably since then. Inside, the main altar, the baptismal font and sculpture of the Virgin and Child date from the early 16th century, while the tower was added in the 17th century. In the old catholic cemetery next to the church, the grave stones date from the late 19th century.
