= Expressway S11 (Poland) =

Road in Poland

Expressway S11
- Droga ekspresowa S11

Route information
- Length: 201.4 km (125.1 mi) plus 10.4 km single carriageway, 556.5 km (346 mi) planned

Major junctions
- From: Kołobrzeg
- S6 near Kołobrzeg (planned) S10 near Piła (planned); A2 and S5 near Poznań; S8 near Kępno A1 near Katowice International Airport in Pyrzowice (planned)
- To: S1 near Pyrzowice

Location
- Country: Poland
- Major cities: Koszalin, Piła, Poznań

Highway system
- National roads in Poland; Voivodeship roads
← S 10	→ S 12

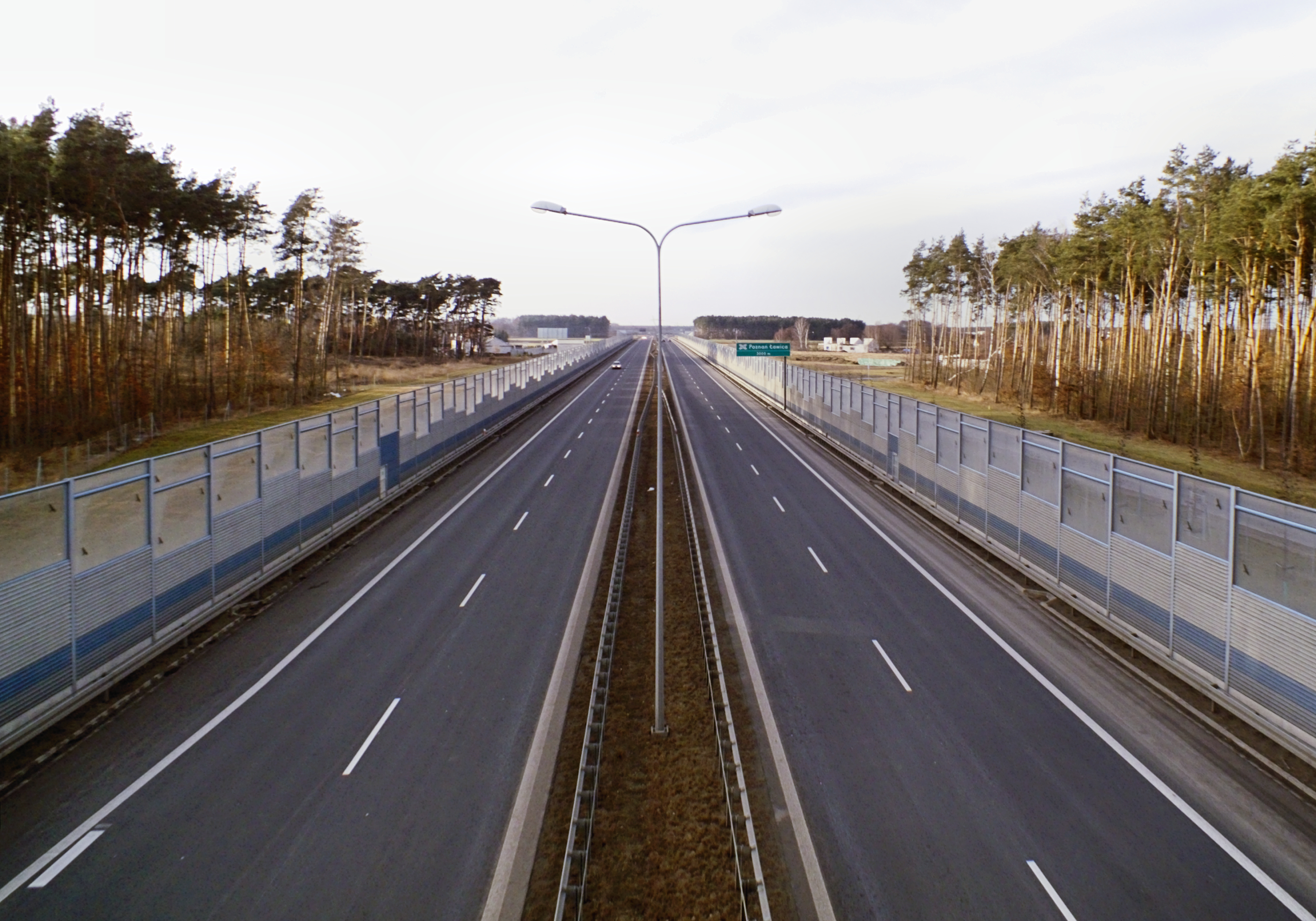
Western bypass of Poznań. View to the north, from the northern (one of three) viaduct between Dąbrowa and Zakrzewo.

Expressway S11 or express road S11 (in Polish droga ekspresowa S11) is a Polish highway which has been planned to run from Kołobrzeg (on the Baltic coast) via Koszalin, Piła and Poznań to Piekary Śląskie (north of Katowice). Its total planned length is about 556.5 kilometres (346 mi).

As of December 2025, several sections serving as bypasses of cities and towns are open to traffic, totalling 120.5 km. A few further sections of the expressway are under construction, but most of it still awaits development. According to the plans, the road should be fully completed by 2033.

== Chronology ==
The tender for construction of a 7.7 kilometres (4.8 mi) long northern-most section (Stage IIa) of the Poznań western bypass between Poznań Północ and Poznań Rokietnica was announced on 26 June 2009. On 14 April 2010, the contract was signed with the consortium of Colas and Strabag. The value of the contract was PLN 229 million. On 30 October 2012, the section was put into operation.

A 14.2 kilometres (8.8 mi) long section (Stage I) of the Poznań western bypass between Poznań Tarnowo Podgórne - Poznań Zachód had a construction permit issued in March 2009. On 26 June 2009, a contract was signed with the consortium of Skanska & Intercor for the price of PLN 458,710,749. On 28 November 2011, an 8.1 kilometres (5.0 mi) long section from the Poznań Tarnowo Podgórne junction to the Poznań Dąbrówka junction was put into operation. On 3 June 2012, a 6.1 kilometres (3.8 mi) long section between Poznań Skórzewo and Poznań Zachód was put into operation.

An environmental decision for the section between Koszalin and Zegrze Pomorskie was issued in October 2011.

On 12 April 2013, a construction contract was concluded with the contractor Skanska for Stage IIb section between Poznań Rokietnica - Poznań Tarnowo Podgórne, without interchanges. The opening of this section to traffic took place on 19 December 2014.

The 12 kilometres (7.5 mi) long Szczecinek bypass tender was announced in August 2014. The section was put into operation in 2019.

The section where the S11 starts (from the Bielice junction to the Koszalin Zachód junction) (with the DK6) has been under construction since 2016 (together with the S6, as part of the task entitled Koszalin and Sianów bypass) and was opened to traffic on 10 October 2019.

In 2023, the bypass of Olesno at a length of 24.8 kilometres (15.4 mi) was completed. On 26 September 2013, the 45 kilometres (28 mi) long section from Koszalin to Bobolice was put into operation.

=== Future developments ===
There are several sections under construction, and under planning. One such under construction is the 12.5 kilometres (7.8 mi) long section between Kępno - Siemianice, on which the tender for construction was signed on 28 March 2023.

In January 2018, a tender was held for the development of the Bobolice - Szczecinek North section with a length of 24.5 kilometres (15.2 mi). The tender was won by Transprojekt Gdański, with whom a contract was signed on 19 March 2018. The design documentation, including construction and detailed designs, was produced within 14 months. Subsequently, on 28 August 2023, the contract for the construction of this section was signed, and the section is now in construction.

The second carriageway of 4 kilometres (2.5 mi) long section in Kępno is under construction and planned to be completed in the second half of 2027.

The S11 route is set to end at the junction with the A1 motorway in Piekary Śląskie, routing past the eastern side of Radzionków, to head towards Nakło Śląskie and Tarnowskie Góry. The start of the works was planned for 2020, however, the planning is an enormous challenge and the process of preparing [this section] for implementation is complex and multi-stage.

== See also ==
- Highways in Poland
