= Młyniec Pierwszy =

- Village
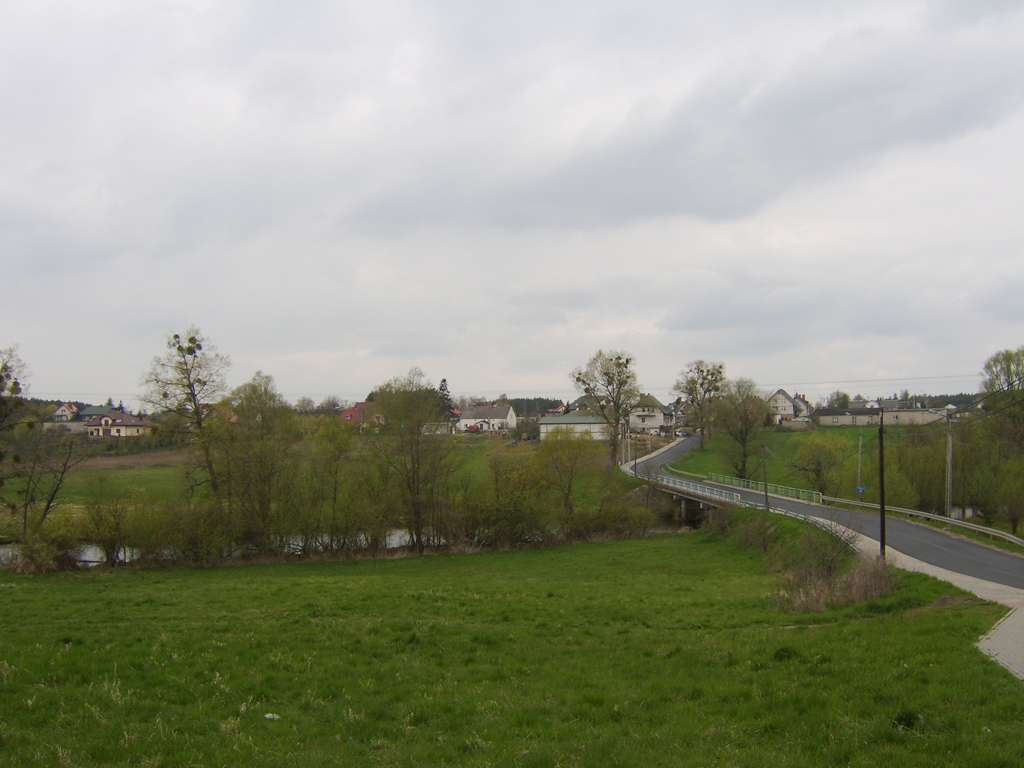

- Location within Poland
- Coordinates: 53°04′00″N 18°48′00″E
- Country: Poland
- Voivodeship: Kuyavian-Pomeranian
- County: Toruń
- Gmina: Lubicz

Młyniec Pierwszy [ˈmwɨɲɛt͡s ˈpjɛrfʂɨ] is a village in the administrative district of Gmina Lubicz, within Toruń County, Kuyavian-Pomeranian Voivodeship, in north-central Poland.
