= Piecnik =

- Village
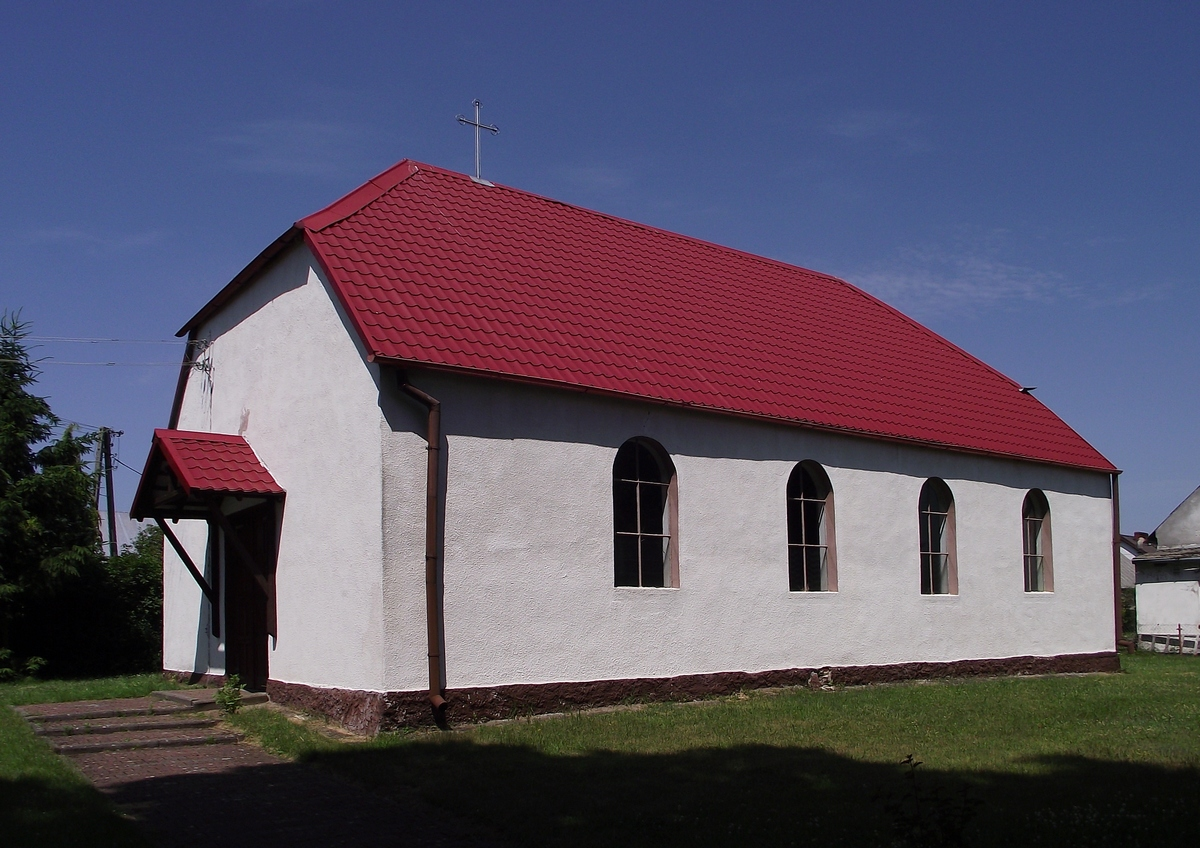
- Exaltation of the Holy Cross church in Piecnik

- Location within Poland
- Coordinates: 53°21′N 16°15′E
- Country: Poland
- Voivodeship: West Pomeranian
- County: Wałcz
- Gmina: Mirosławiec
- Time zone: UTC+1 (CET)
  - Summer (DST): UTC+2 (CEST)
- Postal code: 78-650
- Vehicle registration: ZWA

Piecnik [ˈpjɛt͡snik] (German: Petznick) is a village in the administrative district of Gmina Mirosławiec, within Wałcz County, West Pomeranian Voivodeship, in north-western Poland. It lies approximately 15 km (9 mi) east of Mirosławiec.
