= Lubicz Górny =

- Village
- Location within Poland
- Coordinates: 53°1′N 18°46′E
- Country: Poland
- Voivodeship: Kuyavian-Pomeranian
- County: Toruń
- Gmina: Lubicz
- Population (approx.): 3,400

Lubicz Górny [ˈlubit͡ʂ ˈɡurnɨ] is a village in the administrative district of Gmina Lubicz, within Toruń County, Kuyavian-Pomeranian Voivodeship, in north-central Poland.

The village has an approximate population of 3,400.
