= Cierpiszewo =

- Village
- Location within Poland
- Coordinates: 52°58′45″N 18°30′1″E
- Country: Poland
- Voivodeship: Kuyavian-Pomeranian
- County: Toruń
- Gmina: Wielka Nieszawka

Cierpiszewo [t͡ɕɛrpiˈʂɛvɔ] is a village in the administrative district of Gmina Wielka Nieszawka, in Toruń County, Kuyavian-Pomeranian Voivodeship, in north-central Poland.
