= Dybowo, Kuyavian-Pomeranian Voivodeship =

Dybowo
- Village
- Location within Poland
- Coordinates: 53°0′15″N 18°27′42″E
- Country: Poland
- Voivodeship: Kuyavian-Pomeranian
- County: Toruń
- Gmina: Wielka Nieszawka

Dybowo [dɨˈbɔvɔ] is a village in the administrative district of Gmina Wielka Nieszawka, within Toruń County, Kuyavian-Pomeranian Voivodeship, in north-central Poland.
