= Rogowo, Toruń County =

Rogowo
- Village
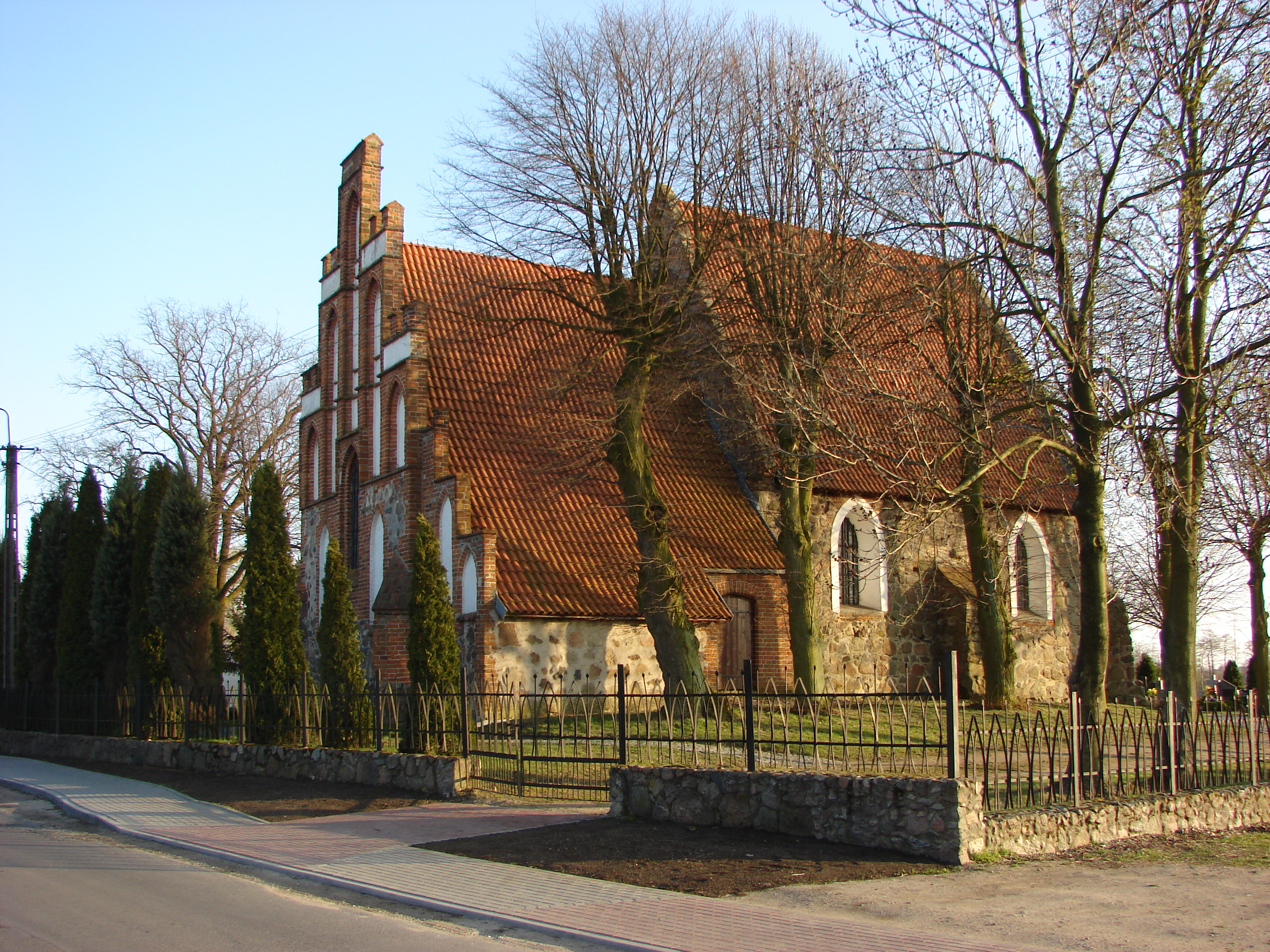
- Parish church of The Holy Cross, 13th-14th century.

- Location within Poland
- Coordinates: 53°4′41″N 18°44′18″E
- Country: Poland
- Voivodeship: Kuyavian-Pomeranian
- County: Toruń
- Gmina: Lubicz
- Population: 300

Rogowo [rɔˈɡɔvɔ] is a village in the administrative district of Gmina Lubicz, within Toruń County, Kuyavian-Pomeranian Voivodeship, in north-central Poland.
