= Jedwabno, Kuyavian-Pomeranian Voivodeship =

Jedwabno
- Village
- Location within Poland
- Coordinates: 53°3′N 18°46′E
- Country: Poland
- Voivodeship: Kuyavian-Pomeranian
- County: Toruń
- Gmina: Lubicz

Jedwabno [jɛdˈvabnɔ] is a village in the administrative district of Gmina Lubicz, within Toruń County, Kuyavian-Pomeranian Voivodeship, in north-central Poland.
