= Rogówko, Toruń County =

Rogówko
- Village
- Location within Poland
- Coordinates: 53°4′0″N 18°46′0″E
- Country: Poland
- Voivodeship: Kuyavian-Pomeranian
- County: Toruń
- Gmina: Lubicz

Rogówko [rɔˈɡufkɔ] is a village in the administrative district of Gmina Lubicz, within Toruń County, Kuyavian-Pomeranian Voivodeship, in north-central Poland.
