= Kolonia Polne =

- Settlement
- Location within Poland
- Coordinates: 53°19′14″N 16°03′46″E
- Country: Poland
- Voivodeship: West Pomeranian
- County: Wałcz
- Gmina: Mirosławiec
- Population: 13

Kolonia Polne [kɔˈlɔɲa ˈpɔlnɛ] is a settlement in the administrative district of Gmina Mirosławiec, within Wałcz County, West Pomeranian Voivodeship, in north-western Poland.

For the history of the region, see History of Pomerania.

The settlement has a population of 13.
