= Wielka Nieszawka =

- Village
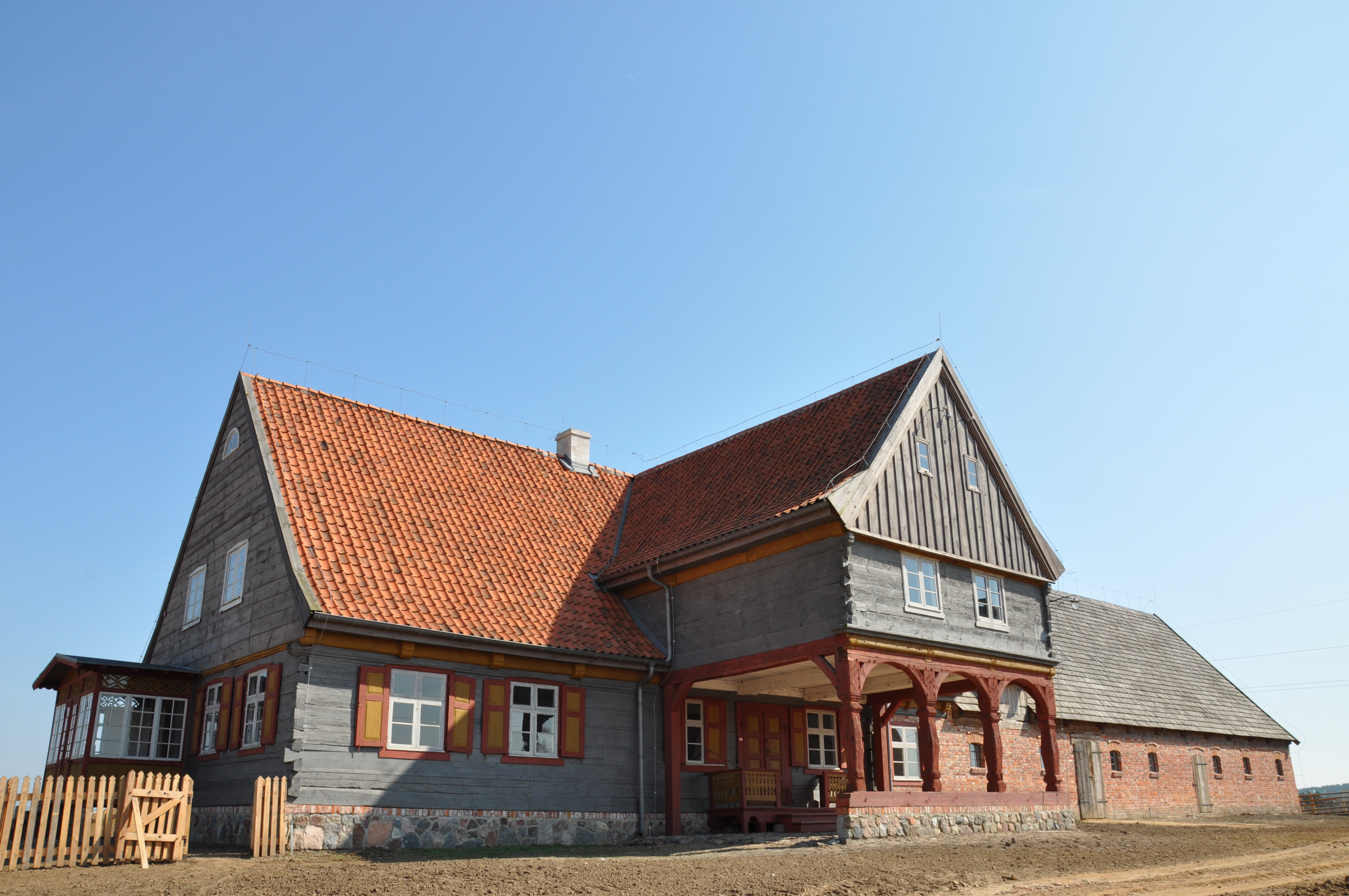
- Mennonites Etnographic Park in Wielka Nieszawka

- Location within Poland
- Coordinates: 52°59′48″N 18°30′28″E
- Country: Poland
- Voivodeship: Kuyavian-Pomeranian
- County: Toruń
- Gmina: Wielka Nieszawka
- Population: 460
- Website: http://www.bip.wielkanieszawka.lo.pl/

Wielka Nieszawka [ˈvjɛlka ɲɛˈʂafka] is a village in Toruń County, Kuyavian-Pomeranian Voivodeship, in north-central Poland. It is the seat of the gmina (administrative district) called Gmina Wielka Nieszawka.
