= Młyniec Drugi =

- Village
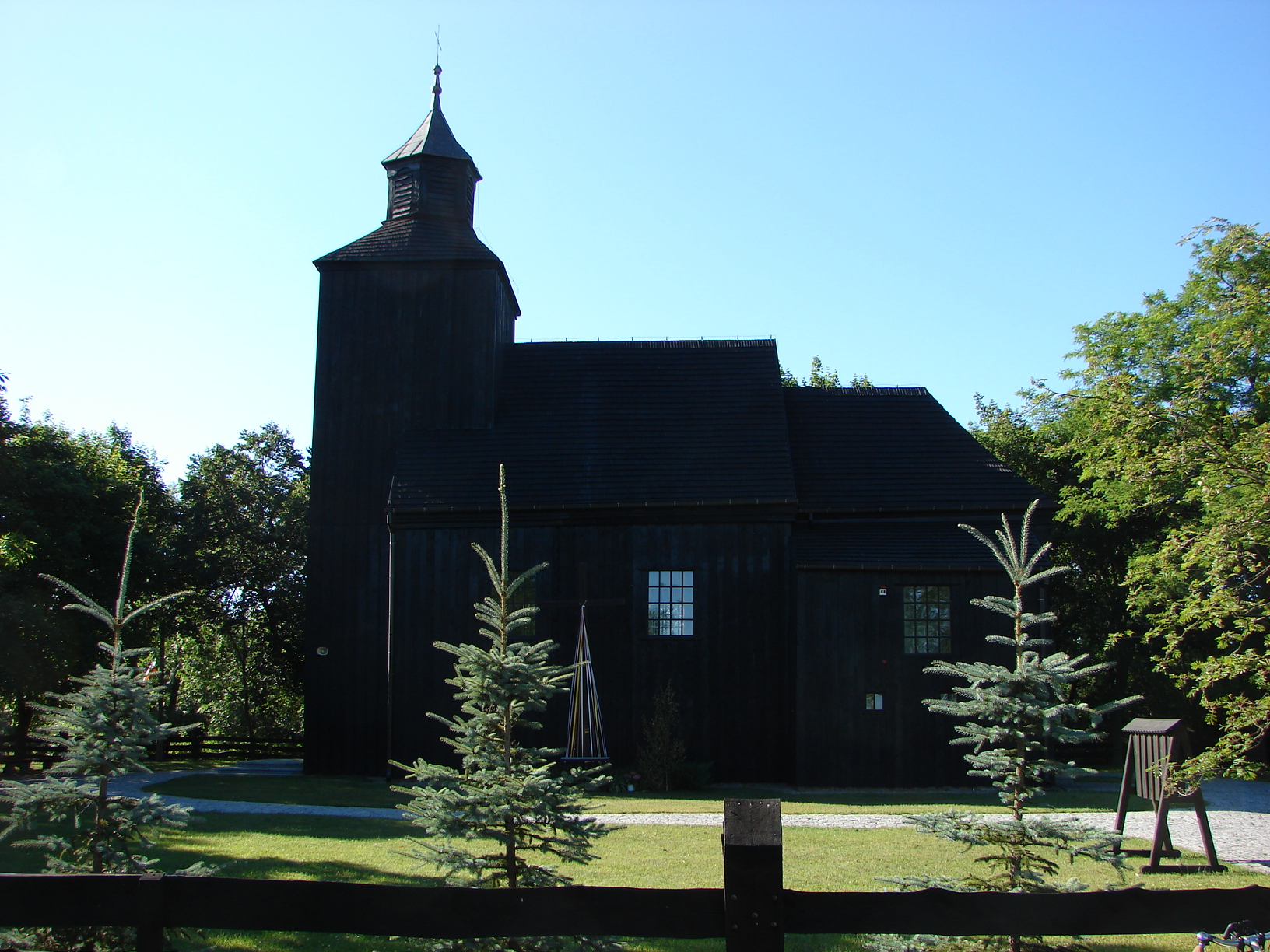
- Wooden church from 1750

- Location within Poland
- Coordinates: 53°03′00″N 18°49′00″E
- Country: Poland
- Voivodeship: Kuyavian-Pomeranian
- County: Toruń
- Gmina: Lubicz
- Population: 390

Młyniec Drugi [ˈmwɨɲɛt͡s ˈdruɡi] is a village in the administrative district of Gmina Lubicz, within Toruń County, Kuyavian-Pomeranian Voivodeship, in north-central Poland.
