= Pilów =

- Settlement
- Location within Poland
- Coordinates: 53°18′20″N 16°19′54″E
- Country: Poland
- Voivodeship: West Pomeranian
- County: Wałcz
- Gmina: Mirosławiec
- Population: 13

Pilów [ˈpiluf] is a settlement in the administrative district of Gmina Mirosławiec, within Wałcz County, West Pomeranian Voivodeship, in north-western Poland.

For the history of the region, see History of Pomerania.

The settlement has a population of 13.
