= Łowicz Wałecki =

- Village
- Location within Poland
- Coordinates: 53°20′N 16°2′E
- Country: Poland
- Voivodeship: West Pomeranian
- County: Wałcz
- Gmina: Mirosławiec

Łowicz Wałecki (Polish: [ˈwɔvid͡ʐ vaˈwɛt͡skʲi]; German: Alt Lobitz) is a village in the administrative district of Gmina Mirosławiec, within Wałcz County, West Pomeranian Voivodeship, in north-western Poland. It lies approximately 4 km (2 mi) west of Mirosławiec, 30 km (19 mi) west of Wałcz, and 97 km (60 mi) east of the regional capital Szczecin.

For the history of the region, see History of Pomerania.
