= Józefowo, Toruń County =

Józefowo
- Village
- Location within Poland
- Coordinates: 53°3′9″N 18°50′13″E
- Country: Poland
- Voivodeship: Kuyavian-Pomeranian
- County: Toruń
- Gmina: Lubicz

Józefowo (Polish pronunciation: [juzɛˈfɔvɔ]; German: 1942–45 Juppshof) is a village in the administrative district of Gmina Lubicz, within Toruń County, Kuyavian-Pomeranian Voivodeship, in north-central Poland.
