= Brzeczka, Kuyavian-Pomeranian Voivodeship =

Brzeczka
- Village
- Location within Poland
- Coordinates: 52°52′23″N 18°35′26″E
- Country: Poland
- Voivodeship: Kuyavian-Pomeranian
- County: Toruń
- Gmina: Wielka Nieszawka

Brzeczka (German 1939-1945 Herzogsfelde) [ˈbʐɛt͡ʂka] is a village in the administrative district of Gmina Wielka Nieszawka, within Toruń County, Kuyavian-Pomeranian Voivodeship, in north-central Poland.
