= Cierpice, Kuyavian-Pomeranian Voivodeship =

Cierpice
- Village
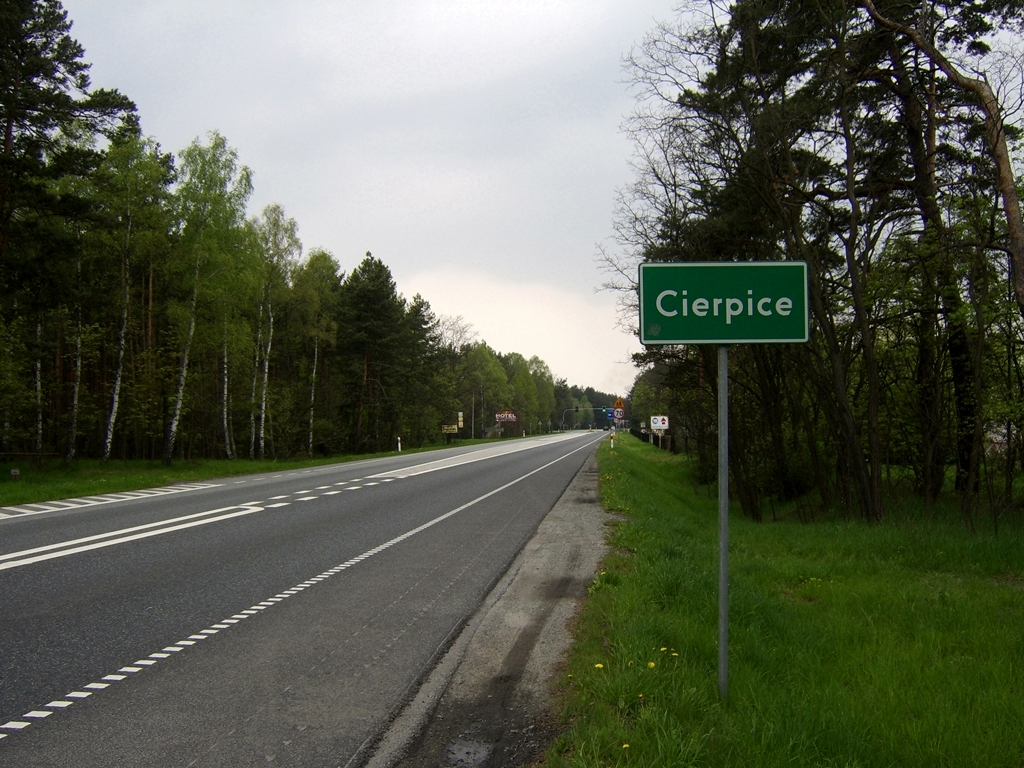
- Entrance to the village

- Location within Poland
- Coordinates: 52°59′5″N 18°29′31″E
- Country: Poland
- Voivodeship: Kuyavian-Pomeranian
- County: Toruń
- Gmina: Wielka Nieszawka
- Population: 1,100
- Time zone: UTC+1 (CET)
  - Summer (DST): UTC+2 (CEST)
- Vehicle registration: CTR

Cierpice [t͡ɕɛrˈpit͡sɛ] is a village in the administrative district of Gmina Wielka Nieszawka, within Toruń County, Kuyavian-Pomeranian Voivodeship, in north-central Poland. It is located in the historic region of Kuyavia.

== History ==
During the German occupation of Poland (World War II), Cierpice was one of the sites of executions of Poles, carried out by the Germans in 1939 as part of the Intelligenzaktion. In November 1940, the German Schutzpolizei carried out expulsions of Poles, who were placed in a transit camp in nearby Toruń, and then either deported to the General Government in the more eastern part of German-occupied Poland or sent to forced labour, while their houses and farms were handed over to German colonists as part of the Lebensraum policy.
