= Popioły, Kuyavian-Pomeranian Voivodeship =

Popioły
- Village
- Location within Poland
- Coordinates: 52°53′31″N 18°36′39″E
- Country: Poland
- Voivodeship: Kuyavian-Pomeranian
- County: Toruń
- Gmina: Wielka Nieszawka
- Population: 0

Popioły [pɔˈpjɔwɨ] is a former village in the administrative district of Gmina Wielka Nieszawka, within Toruń County, Kuyavian-Pomeranian Voivodeship, in north-central Poland.
