= Kopanino, Kuyavian-Pomeranian Voivodeship =

Kopanino
- Village
- Location within Poland
- Coordinates: 52°59′N 18°44′E
- Country: Poland
- Voivodeship: Kuyavian-Pomeranian
- County: Toruń
- Gmina: Lubicz
- Population: 180

Kopanino [kɔpaˈninɔ] is a village in the administrative district of Gmina Lubicz, within Toruń County, Kuyavian-Pomeranian Voivodeship, in north-central Poland.

In 2004 the village had a population of 180.
