= Hanki-Kolonia =

- Village
- Location within Poland
- Coordinates: 53°18′40″N 16°9′44″E
- Country: Poland
- Voivodeship: West Pomeranian
- County: Wałcz
- Gmina: Mirosławiec
- Population: 92

Hanki-Kolonia [ˈxanki kɔˈlɔɲa] is a village in the administrative district of Gmina Mirosławiec, within Wałcz County, West Pomeranian Voivodeship, in north-western Poland.

For the history of the region, see History of Pomerania.

The village has a population of 92.
