= Lubicz Dolny =

- Village
- Location within Poland
- Coordinates: 53°1′52″N 18°44′46″E
- Country: Poland
- Voivodeship: Kuyavian-Pomeranian
- County: Toruń
- Gmina: Lubicz
- Population: 1,900

Lubicz Dolny [ˈlubit͡ʂ ˈdɔlnɨ] is a village in the administrative district of Gmina Lubicz, within Toruń County, Kuyavian-Pomeranian Voivodeship, in north-central Poland.
