= Gniewosz, West Pomeranian Voivodeship =

Gniewosz
- Settlement
- Location within Poland
- Coordinates: 53°20′57″N 16°04′16″E
- Country: Poland
- Voivodeship: West Pomeranian
- County: Wałcz
- Gmina: Mirosławiec
- Population: 8

Gniewosz [ˈɡɲɛvɔʂ] is a settlement in the administrative district of Gmina Mirosławiec, within Wałcz County, West Pomeranian Voivodeship, in north-western Poland.

For the history of the region, see History of Pomerania.

The settlement has a population of eight.
