= Brzeźno, Toruń County =

Brzeźno
- Village
- Location within Poland
- Coordinates: 53°5′N 18°46′E
- Country: Poland
- Voivodeship: Kuyavian-Pomeranian
- County: Toruń
- Gmina: Lubicz
- Population: 370

Brzeźno [ˈbʐɛʑnɔ] is a village in the administrative district of Gmina Lubicz, within Toruń County, Kuyavian-Pomeranian Voivodeship, in north-central Poland.
