= 2008 Polish Air Force C-295 crash =

2008 aviation accident in Poland

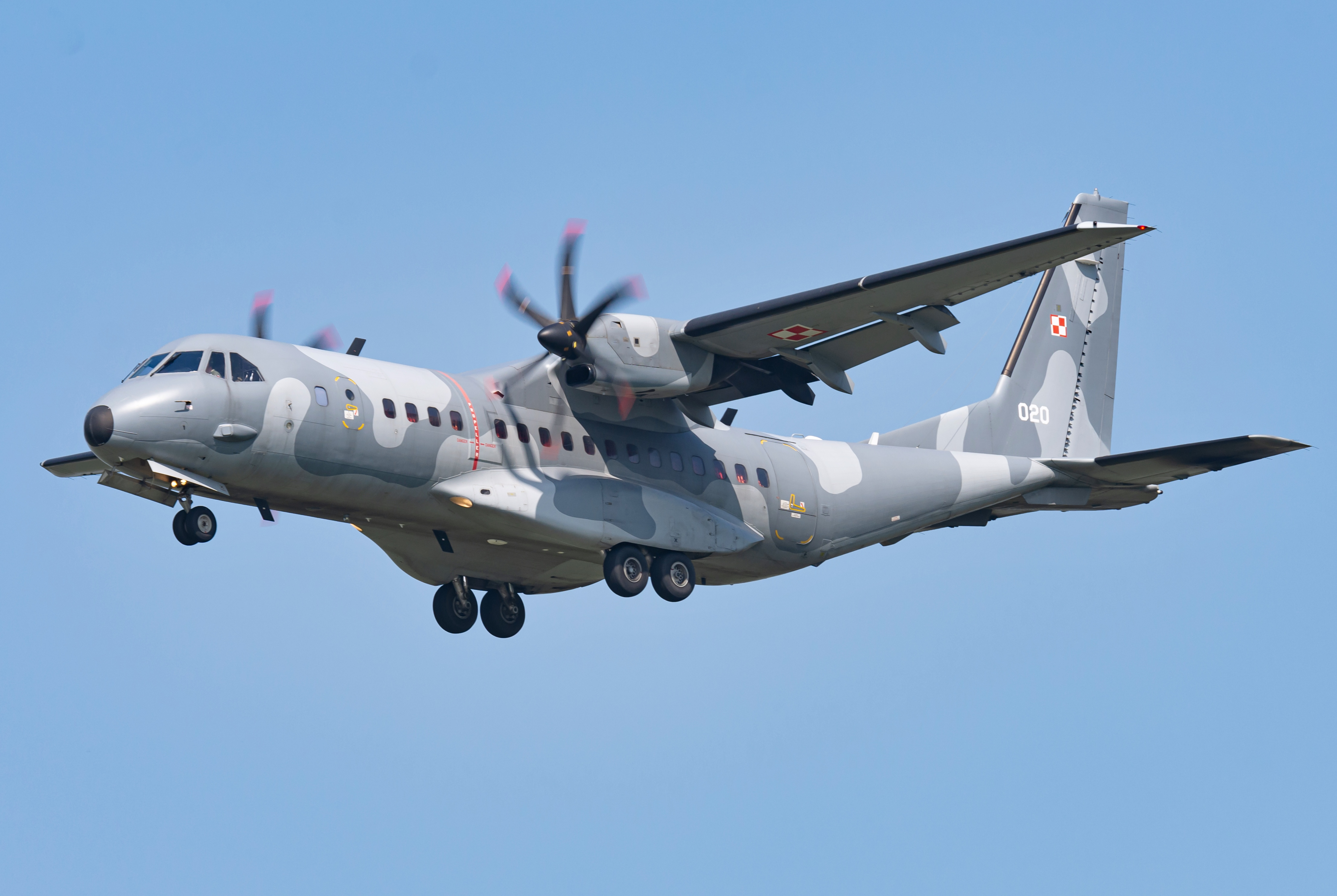
- A Polish Air Force CASA C-295, similar to the aircraft involved in the accident

Accident
- Date: 23 January 2008
- Summary: Controlled flight into terrain in poor weather conditions
- Site: Mirosławiec, Poland; 53°22′48″N 16°06′39″E

Aircraft
- Aircraft type: EADS CASA C-295
- Operator: Polish Air Force
- Registration: 019
- Flight origin: Warsaw Frederic Chopin Airport, Poland
- Destination: 12th Air Base, Mirosławiec, Poland
- Occupants: 20
- Passengers: 16
- Crew: 4
- Fatalities: 20
- Survivors: 0

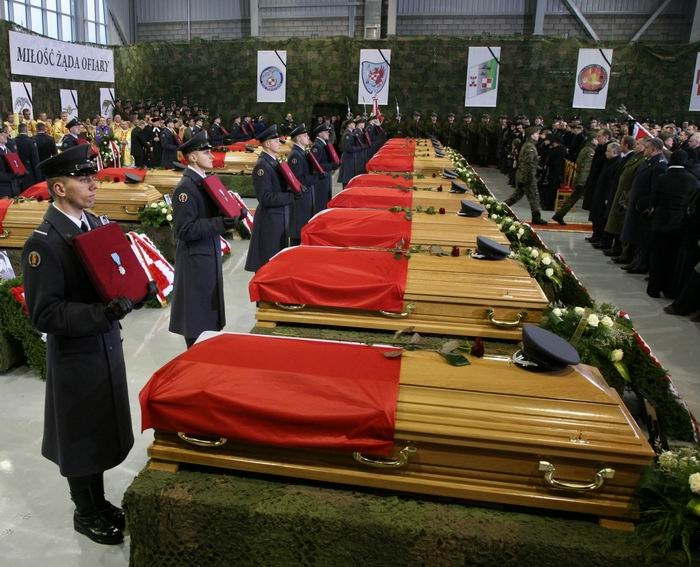
State funeral of the crash victims

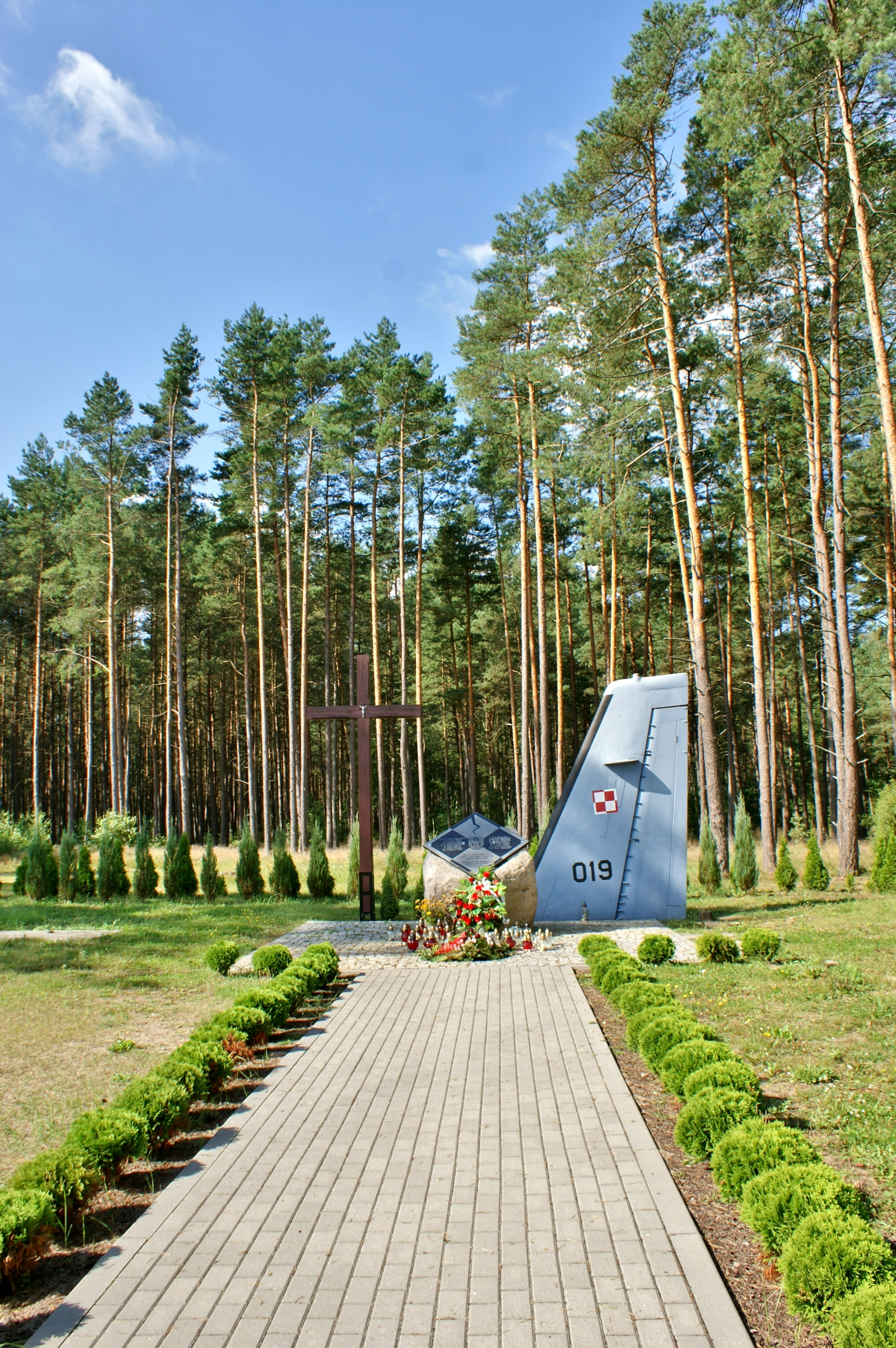
Memorial at crash site

On 23 January 2008, a Polish Air Force EADS CASA C-295 military transport plane, flying from Warsaw, crashed in Mirosławiec as it was attempting to land at the 12th Air Base, killing all 20 passengers and crew. The 20 victims on board included high-ranking Polish air force officers.

Among the fatalities was Brig. Gen. Andrzej Andrzejewski, commander of an air brigade based in Świdwin.

This was the first fatal accident involving a CASA C-295. Subsequently, all Polish C-295s were grounded until further notice.

== Investigation ==
In the subsequent investigations the primary cause of the accident was determined to be an inadvertent loss of spatial and situational awareness by the aircraft crew during the landing approach in poor weather conditions, with a low cloud ceiling and little visibility.

A number of secondary causes and contributing factors were also found by the investigation after the accident, including deficiencies in the air traffic controllers' skills and methods of directing and controlling the landing. Military experts had qualified it as "the safest plane of the Polish air force".

== Aftermath ==
The Polish defence minister Bogdan Klich dismissed five air force personnel after the accident investigation concluded that multiple failings contributed to the crash.

== See also ==
- List of disasters in Poland by death toll
- 2010 Polish Air Force Tu-154 crash
