= Kąkol, Kuyavian-Pomeranian Voivodeship =

Kąkol
- Village
- Location within Poland
- Coordinates: 52°59′22″N 18°27′1″E
- Country: Poland
- Voivodeship: Kuyavian-Pomeranian
- County: Toruń
- Gmina: Wielka Nieszawka

Kąkol [ˈkɔnkɔl] is a village in the administrative district of Gmina Wielka Nieszawka, within Toruń County, Kuyavian-Pomeranian Voivodeship, in north-central Poland.
