= Gmina Mirosławiec =

Gmina Mirosławiec Mirosławiec Commune
- Gmina
- Flag Coat of arms
- Interactive map of Gmina Mirosławiec
- Coordinates (Mirosławiec): 53°20′38″N 16°5′14″E
- Country: Poland
- Voivodeship: West Pomeranian
- County: Wałcz
- Seat: Mirosławiec

Area
  - Total: 203.27 km^{2} (78.48 sq mi)

Population (2006)
  - Total: 6,026
  - Density: 29.65/km^{2} (76.78/sq mi)
  - Urban: 2,633
  - Rural: 3,393
- Website: http://www.miroslawiec.pl/

Gmina Mirosławiec is an urban-rural gmina (administrative district) in Wałcz County, West Pomeranian Voivodeship, in north-western Poland. Its seat is the town of Mirosławiec, which lies approximately 27 kilometres (17 mi) west of Wałcz and 101 km (63 mi) east of the regional capital Szczecin.

The gmina covers an area of 203.27 square kilometres (78.5 sq mi), and as of 2006 its total population is 6,026 (out of which the population of Mirosławiec amounts to 2,633, and the population of the rural part of the gmina is 3,393).

== Villages ==
Apart from the town of Mirosławiec, Gmina Mirosławiec contains the villages and settlements of Bronikowo, Drzewoszewo, Gniewosz, Hanki, Hanki-Kolonia, Jabłonkowo, Jabłonowo, Jadwiżyn, Kalinówka, Kierpnik, Kolonia Chojnice, Kolonia Polne, Kolonia Zacisze, Łowicz Wałecki, Mirosławiec Górny, Nieradź, Piecnik, Pilów, Próchnowo, Sadowo, Setnica and Toporzyk.

== Neighbouring gminas ==
Gmina Mirosławiec is bordered by the gminas of Kalisz Pomorski, Tuczno, Wałcz and Wierzchowo.
