= Stara Łubianka =

- Village
- Location within Poland
- Coordinates: 53°14′N 16°41′E
- Country: Poland
- Voivodeship: Greater Poland
- County: Piła
- Gmina: Szydłowo
- Population: 1,300
- Website: http://www.staralubianka.pl

Stara Łubianka [ˈstara wuˈbjanka] (German: Lebehnke) is a village in the administrative district of Gmina Szydłowo, within Piła County, Greater Poland Voivodeship, in west-central Poland.
