= Mała Nieszawka =

- Village
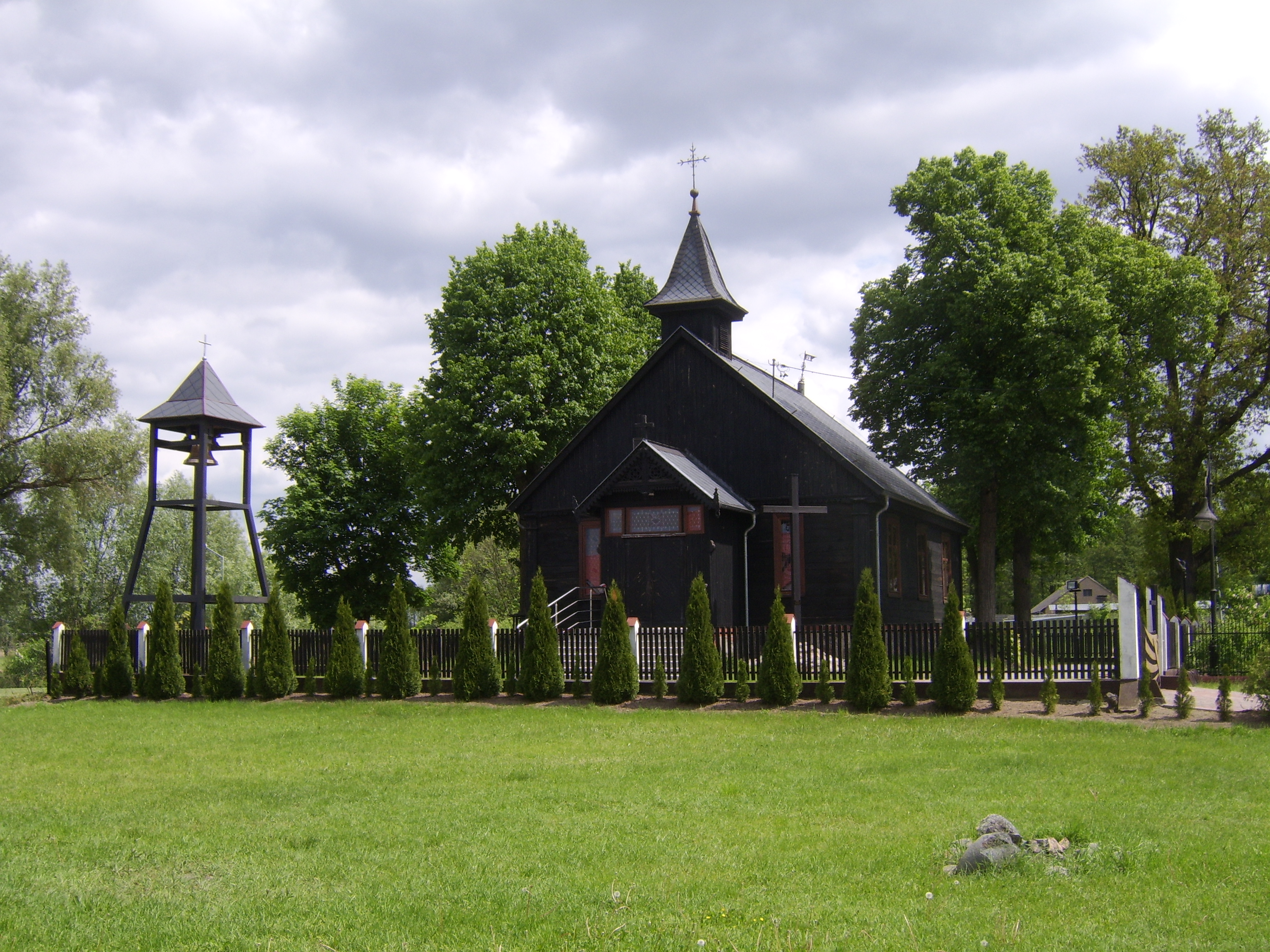
- Sacred Heart church in Mała Nieszawka

- Location within Poland
- Coordinates: 52°59′22″N 18°33′13″E
- Country: Poland
- Voivodeship: Kuyavian-Pomeranian
- County: Toruń
- Gmina: Wielka Nieszawka
- Population: 1,400
- Time zone: UTC+1 (CET)
  - Summer (DST): UTC+2 (CEST)
- Vehicle registration: CTR

Mała Nieszawka [ˈmawa ɲɛˈʂafka] is a village in the administrative district of Gmina Wielka Nieszawka, within Toruń County, Kuyavian-Pomeranian Voivodeship, in north-central Poland.

== History ==
Polish–Teutonic peace talks, which ended the Thirteen Years' War, were held in the settlement at the turn of September and October 1466.

During the German occupation (World War II), in November 1939, Polish teachers from Mała Nieszawka were murdered by the Germans in Barbarka (present-day district of Toruń) during a massacre of Polish teachers from the region carried out as part of the Intelligenzaktion. Poles were also subjected to expulsions, carried out in November 1940.
