= Expressway S50 (Poland) =

Planned motorway in Poland

Expressway S50
- Droga ekspresowa S50

Route information
- Length: 120 km (75 mi) approx, planned

Major junctions
- From: A 2 near Solidarity Transport Hub

- S 10 near Płock; S 7 near Płońsk; S 8 near Radzymin

- To: A 2 near Mińsk Mazowiecki

Location
- Country: Poland
- Major cities: Warsaw

Highway system
- National roads in Poland; Voivodeship roads
← S 22	→ S 51

The S50 expressway is a planned expressway in Poland, in Masovian Voivodeship. It will run as a circle road north to the Warsaw metropolitan area to take over the transit traffic from the existing expressway ring around the city, mainly from the S8 and S17 expressways, as well as will be one of the road connectors to the planned Solidarity Transport Hub. It was added to the motorway and expressway index by Polish government on 24 September 2019.

== Previous route ==
In 1996, the S50 designation was applied to a route from Elbląg to the Russian border at Grzechotki, along with an unrealized section from the A1 at Tczew to Elbląg. This was changed to S22 in 2001 with the route to Elbląg shortened.

== See also ==
- National road 50 (Poland)
