= Lubicz, Kuyavian-Pomeranian Voivodeship =

Lubicz
- Village
- Location within Poland
- Coordinates: 53°2′N 18°46′E
- Country: Poland
- Voivodeship: Kuyavian-Pomeranian
- County: Toruń
- Gmina: Lubicz
- Time zone: UTC+1 (CET)
  - Summer (DST): UTC+2 (CEST)
- Vehicle registration: CTR

Lubicz [ˈlubit͡ʂ] is a village in Toruń County, Kuyavian-Pomeranian Voivodeship, in north-central Poland. It is the seat of the gmina (administrative district) called Gmina Lubicz.

== History ==
During the German occupation of Poland (World War II), Lubicz was one of the sites of executions of Poles, carried out by the Germans in 1939 as part of the Intelligenzaktion. Local Polish teachers were murdered by the Germans during the large massacres of Poles committed in the Barbarka forest in Toruń in 1939, also as part of the Intelligenzaktion. In 1939, the occupiers also carried out expulsions of 80 Poles, who were sent to forced labour, while their houses and farms were handed over to German colonists as part of the Lebensraum policy. The local Polish police chief was murdered by the Russians in the Katyn massacre in 1940. The Polish resistance published the Nasza Warta Polish underground newspaper in Lubicz.
