= Gmina Wielka Nieszawka =

Gmina Wielka Nieszawka Wielka Nieszawka Commune
- Gmina
- Flag Coat of arms

- Location within Poland
- Coordinates (Wielka Nieszawka): 52°59′48″N 18°30′28″E
- Country: Poland
- Voivodeship: Kuyavian-Pomeranian
- County: Toruń County
- Seat: Wielka Nieszawka

Area
  - Total: 216.28 km^{2} (83.51 sq mi)

Population (2006)
  - Total: 3,929
  - Density: 18.17/km^{2} (47.05/sq mi)
- Website: http://www.bip.wielkanieszawka.lo.pl

Gmina Wielka Nieszawka is a rural gmina (administrative district) in Toruń County, Kuyavian-Pomeranian Voivodeship, in north-central Poland. Its seat is the village of Wielka Nieszawka, which lies approximately 9 kilometres (6 mi) south-west of Toruń.

The gmina covers an area of 216.28 square kilometres (83.5 sq mi), and as of 2006 its total population is 3,929.

== Villages ==
Gmina Wielka Nieszawka contains the villages and settlements of Brzeczka, Brzoza, Chorągiewka, Cierpice, Cierpiszewo, Dybowo, Kąkol, Maciejewo, Mała Nieszawka, Małe Jarki, Pieczenia, Popioły and Wielka Nieszawka.

== Neighbouring gminas ==
Gmina Wielka Nieszawka is bordered by the city of Toruń and by the gminas of Aleksandrów Kujawski, Gniewkowo, Lubicz, Obrowo, Rojewo, Solec Kujawski and Zławieś Wielka.
