= Witankowo =

- Village
- Location within Poland
- Coordinates: 53°14′52″N 16°34′45″E
- Country: Poland
- Voivodeship: West Pomeranian
- County: Wałcz
- Gmina: Wałcz
- Population: 420

Witankowo [vitaŋˈkɔvɔ] (German: Wittkow) is a village in the administrative district of Gmina Wałcz, within Wałcz County, West Pomeranian Voivodeship, in north-western Poland. It lies approximately 8 km (5 mi) east of Wałcz and 134 km (83 mi) east of the regional capital Szczecin.
