= Krąpiel, Stargard County =

Krąpiel
- Village
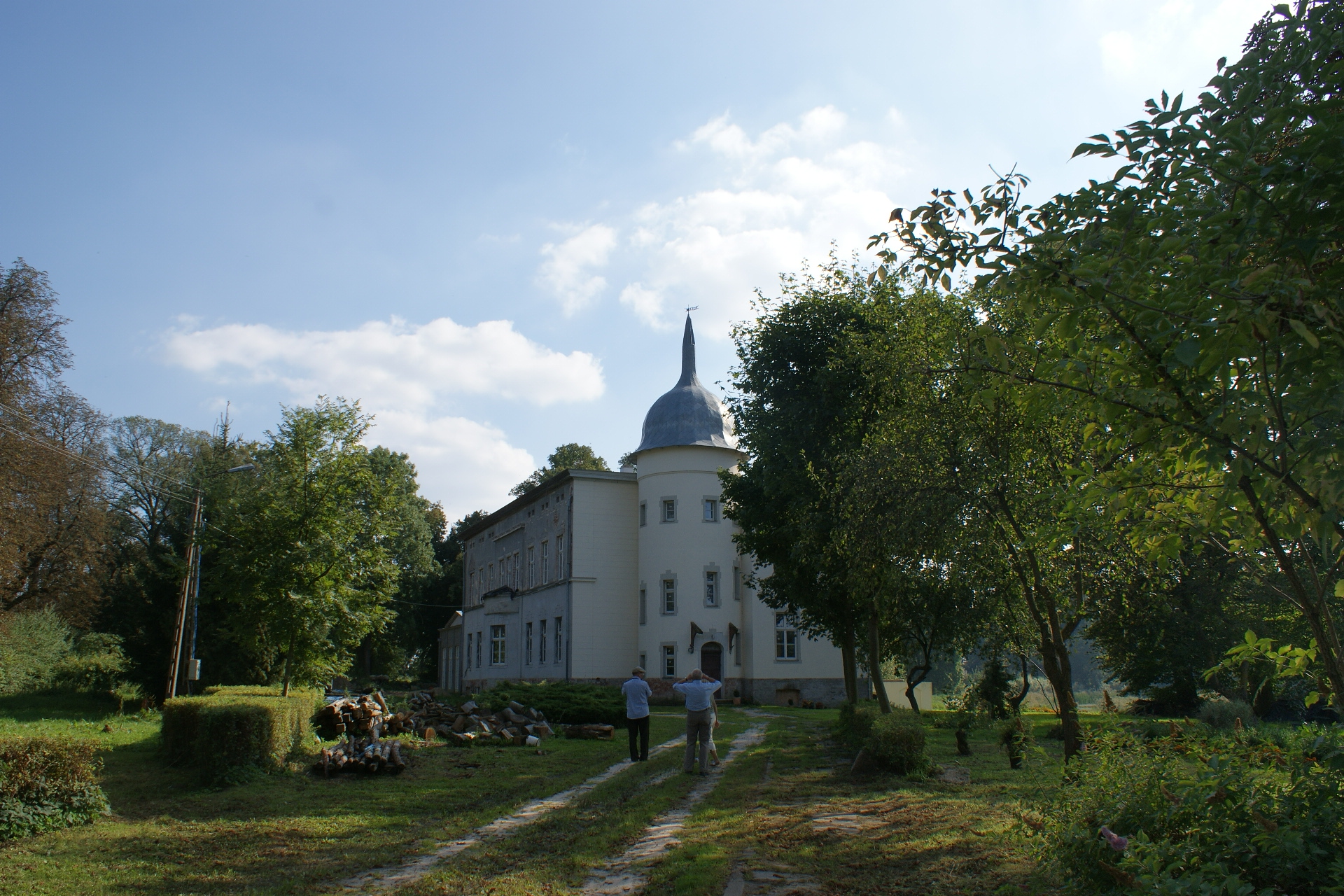
- Krąpiel, pałac1

- Location within Poland
- Coordinates: 53°18′01″N 15°10′41″E
- Country: Poland
- Voivodeship: West Pomeranian
- County: Stargard
- Gmina: Stargard
- Population (approx.): 980

Krąpiel [ˈkrɔmpjɛl] is a village in the administrative district of Gmina Stargard, within Stargard County, West Pomeranian Voivodeship, in north-western Poland.

For the history of the region, see History of Pomerania.

The village has an approximate population of 980.

== Transport ==
Krąpiel lies on national road 10.

The nearest railway station is in Stargard.
