= Gmina Lubicz =

Gmina Lubicz Lubicz Commune
- Gmina
- Flag Coat of arms

- Location within Poland
- Coordinates (Lubicz): 53°2′N 18°46′E
- Country: Poland
- Voivodeship: Kuyavian-Pomeranian
- County: Toruń County
- Seat: Lubicz

Area
  - Total: 106.03 km^{2} (40.94 sq mi)

Population (2012)
  - Total: 18,788
  - Density: 177.20/km^{2} (458.93/sq mi)
- Website: http://www.lubicz.pl/

Gmina Lubicz is a rural gmina (administrative district) in Toruń County, Kuyavian-Pomeranian Voivodeship, in north-central Poland. Its seat is the village of Lubicz, which lies approximately 11 kilometres (7 mi) east of Toruń. The gmina covers an area of 106.03 square kilometres (40.9 sq mi), and as of 2012 its population is 18,788.

== Villages ==
Gmina Lubicz contains the villages and settlements of Brzezinko, Brzeźno, Grabowiec, Grębocin, Gronowo, Jedwabno, Józefowo, Kopanino, Krobia, Lubicz, Lubicz Dolny, Lubicz Górny, Mierzynek, Młyniec Drugi, Młyniec Pierwszy, Nowa Wieś, Rogówko, Rogowo and Złotoria.

== Neighbouring gminas ==
Gmina Lubicz is bordered by the city of Toruń and by the gminas of Ciechocin, Kowalewo Pomorskie, Łysomice, Obrowo and Wielka Nieszawka.
