= Nowa Wieś, Toruń County =

Nowa Wieś
- Village
- Location within Poland
- Coordinates: 53°1′N 18°46′E
- Country: Poland
- Voivodeship: Kuyavian-Pomeranian
- County: Toruń
- Gmina: Lubicz

Nowa Wieś (German Neudorf b. Gollub) [ˈnɔva ˈvjɛɕ] is a village in the administrative district of Gmina Lubicz, within Toruń County, Kuyavian-Pomeranian Voivodeship, in north-central Poland.
