= Mirosławiec =

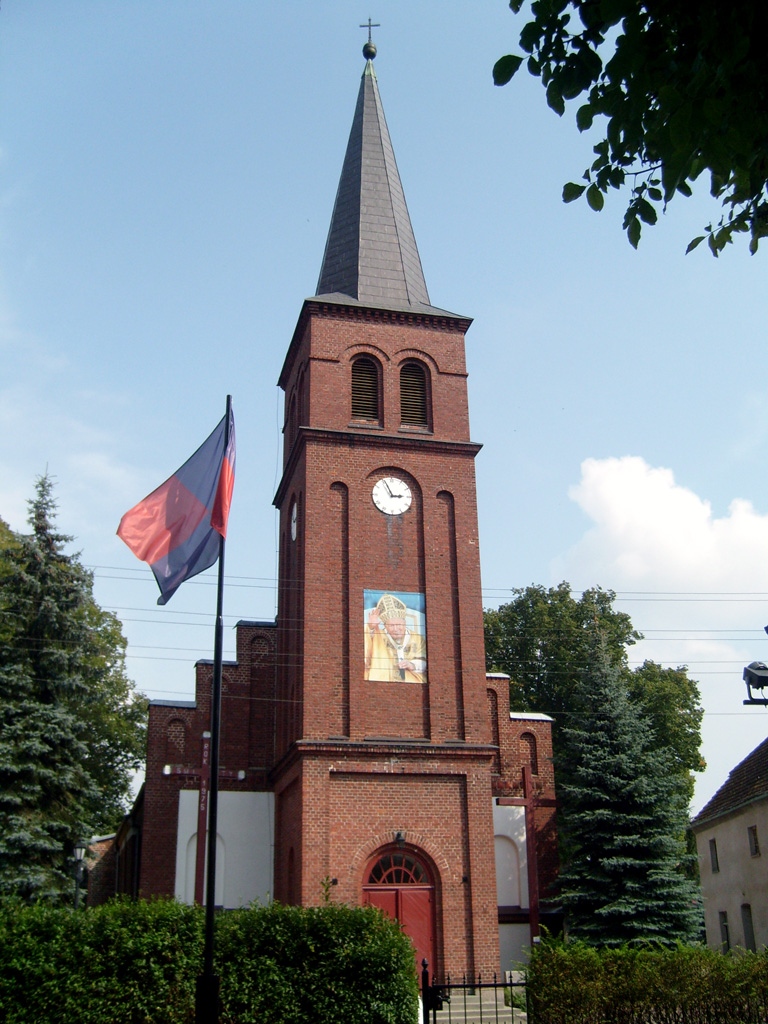
- Immaculate Conception church in Mirosławiec

- Flag Coat of arms

- Location within Poland
- Coordinates: 53°20′38″N 16°5′14″E
- Country: Poland
- Voivodeship: West Pomeranian
- County: Wałcz
- Gmina: Mirosławiec

Area
  - Total: 2.13 km^{2} (0.82 sq mi)

Population (2010)
  - Total: 2,671
  - Density: 1,250/km^{2} (3,250/sq mi)
- Time zone: UTC+1 (CET)
  - Summer (DST): UTC+2 (CEST)
- Postal code: 78-650
- Area code: +48 67
- Vehicle registration: ZWA

Mirosławiec (Polish pronunciation: [mi.rɔˈswa.vjɛt͡s]; German: Märkisch Friedland) is a town in Wałcz County, West Pomeranian Voivodeship, in northwestern Poland, with 2,671 inhabitants (2010).

The 12th Air Base of the Polish Air Force is located 5 kilometres (3 miles) north of the town.

== History ==
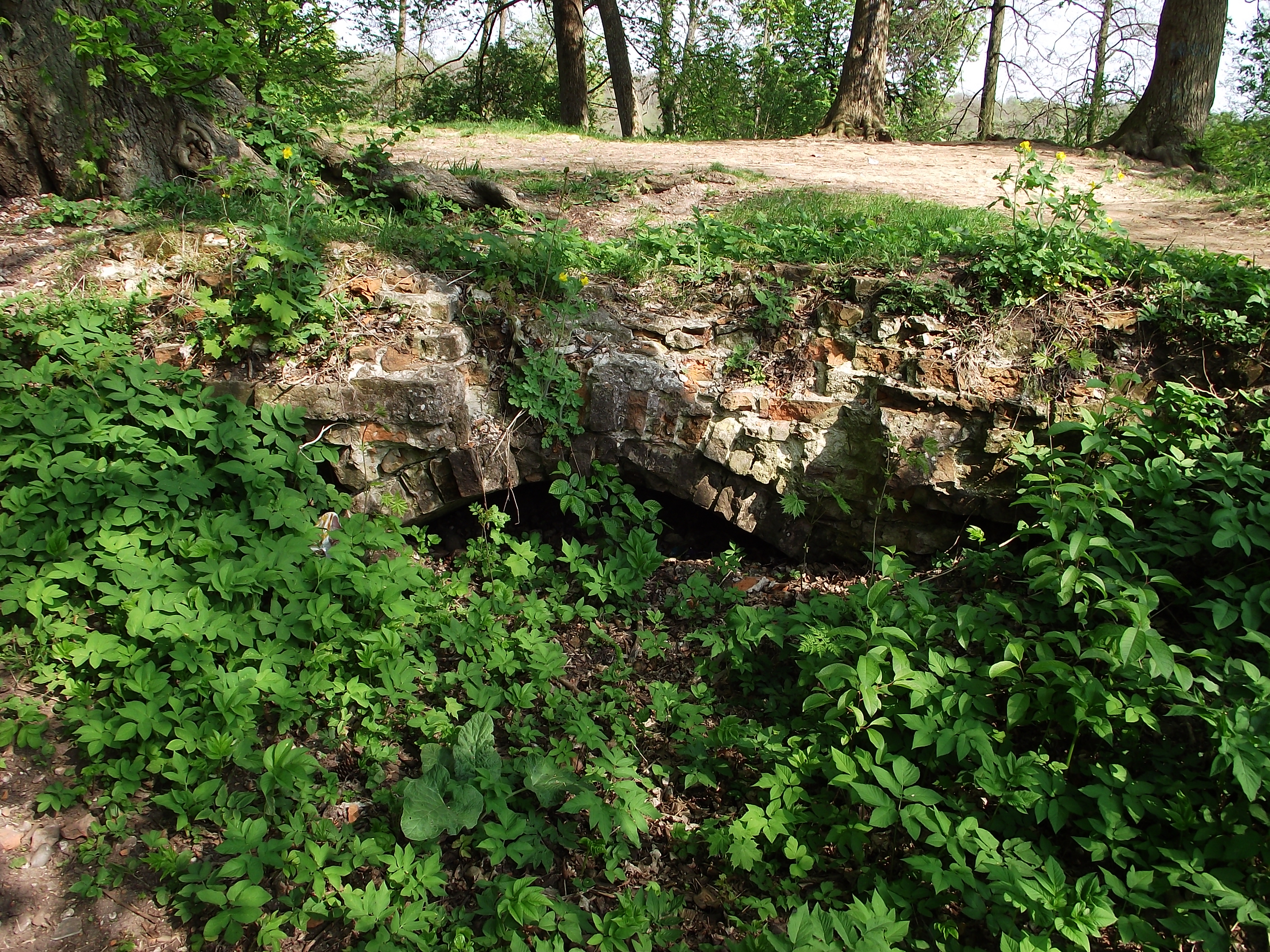
Remains of a medieval castle

Mirosławiec is a former private town, once located in the Poznań Voivodeship in the Greater Poland Province of the Crown of the Kingdom of Poland. It was annexed by Prussia in the First Partition of Poland in 1772.

During World War II, the Germans operated a forced labour subcamp of the Stalag II-B prisoner-of-war camp for Allied POWs in the town. On 10 February 1945 it was captured by Polish troops.

Mirosławiec was the site of the 2008 Polish Air Force C-295 crash.

== Demographics ==
Historical population

Year	Pop.	±%
1843	2,280	—
1871	2,521	+10.6%
1880	2,498	−0.9%
1890	2,265	−9.3%
1900	2,233	−1.4%

Year	Pop.	±%
1910	1,929	−13.6%
1925	2,062	+6.9%
1950	1,233	−40.2%
1960	2,513	+103.8%
2010	2,671	+6.3%

== People ==
- Akiva Eiger (1761-1837) Rabbi in Märkisch Friedland 1791 until 1815
- Philipp Phoebus (1804–1880), German physician and pharmacologist
- Benjamin Liebermann (1812-1901), German textile manufacturer
- Heinrich von Friedberg (1813–1895), German jurist and statesman
- Joseph Abraham Stargardt (1822–1885), German businessman
- Julius Wolff (1836–1902), German surgeon
- Fedor Krause (1857-1937) German Neurosurgeon,

== Transport ==
Mirosławiec lies on national road 10.

National road 10 connects Mirosławiec to Szczecin to the west and to Piła to the east.

The nearest railway station is in Kalisz Pomorski.

== See also ==
- Friedland
