= Barbarka massacre =

1939 mass executions by German occupiers

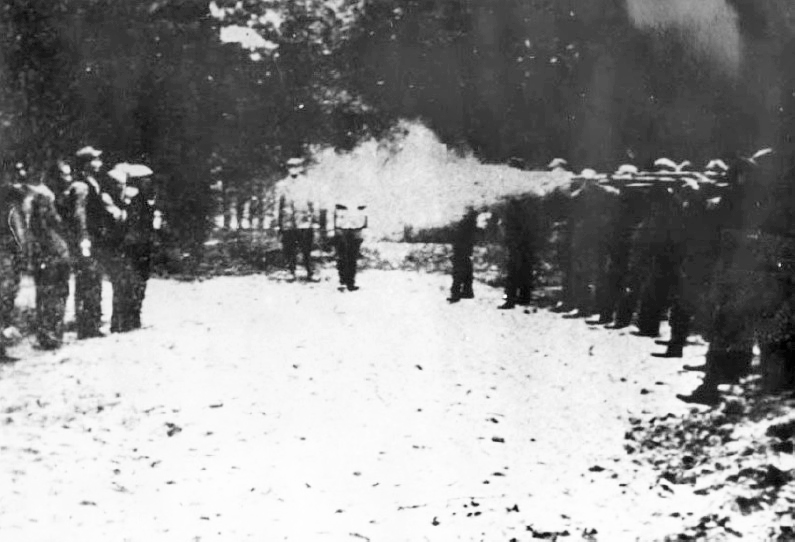
- Execution in the Barbarka forest
- Location: 53.060520°N 18.539485°E; Toruń, Poland
- Date: 1939
- Attack type: execution by firing squad
- Deaths: 600
- Perpetrator: Nazi Germany

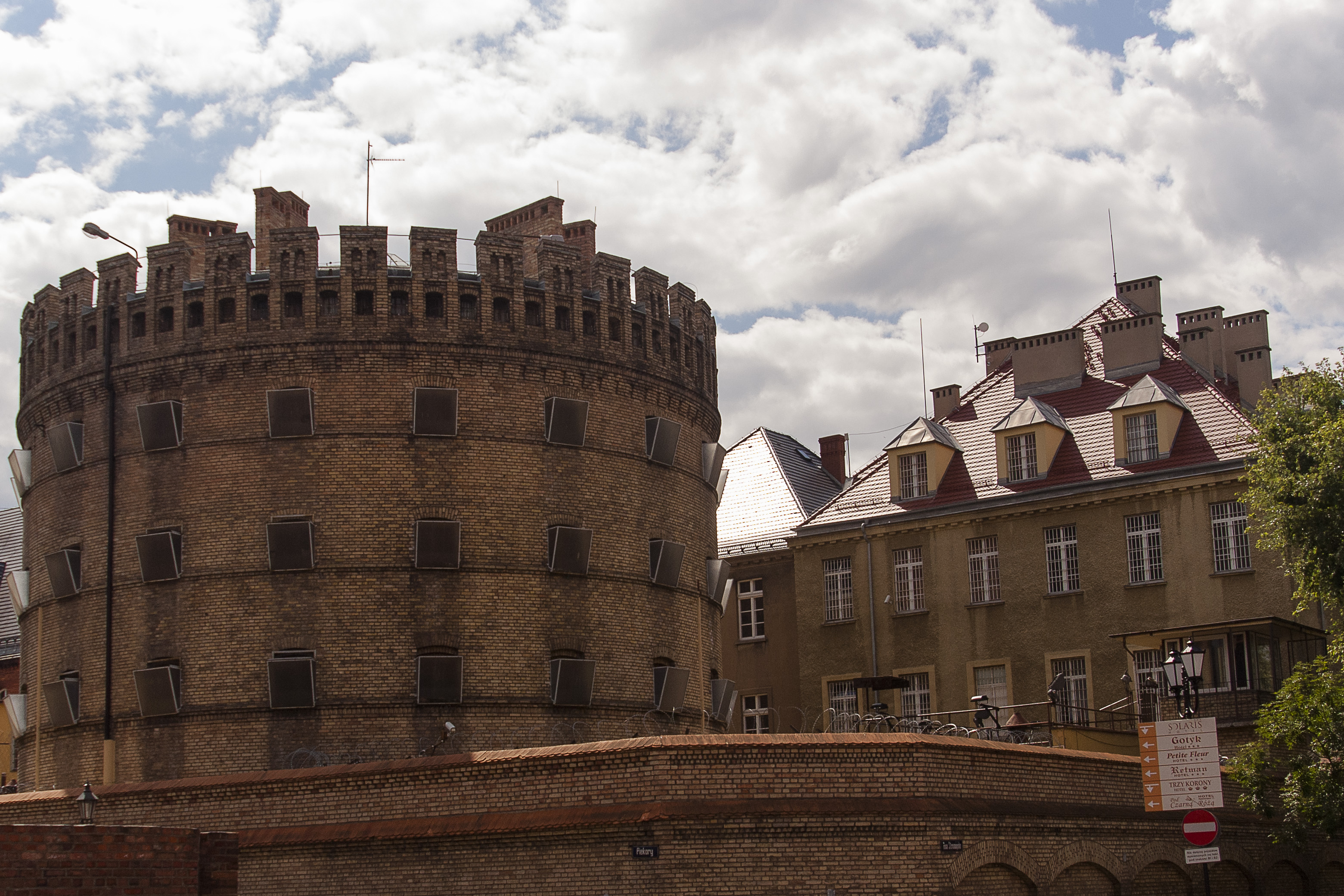
The Toruń Okrąglak, where people arrested in the early days of the occupation were detained.

The Barbarka massacre was a series of mass executions carried out by German occupiers in the autumn of 1939 in the Barbarka forest near Toruń, Poland.

The mass executions in Barbarka were part of the so-called Intelligenzaktion, and they were carried out by SS officers and members of the paramilitary Selbstschutz. Polish historians estimate that at least 600 people were murdered in Barbarka. The victims were prisoners of the internment camp set up by the Germans in the casemates of Fort VII of the Toruń Fortress. Among them were many representatives of the Polish social elite and intelligentsia from Toruń and surrounding areas.

== Beginning of German occupation ==
=== First repressions ===
On 7 September 1939, Wehrmacht units entered Toruń. Over the next two days, the military, along with the Security Police, conducted preventive arrests in Toruń, detaining dozens of people as hostages. The occupier's terror also affected other towns in the Toruń County. On September 14, in Czarnowo and Rubinkowo, the Wehrmacht and gendarmerie, with the assistance of local Volksdeutsche, respectively executed six and five Poles. Individual executions also took place in three other villages.

Arrests and executions were accompanied by other actions aimed at the non-German population. Already on September 9, the deputy of the head of the civil administration of the German 4th Army established in Toruń the office of a trustee for Jewish estates and the office of a trustee for the estates belonging to Polish refugees who had not managed to return to the city. From mid-September, properties and businesses belonging to remaining Poles were also confiscated. On September 10, the occupiers dissolved all Polish organizations, including all scientific societies and institutions. They also began to liquidate Polish theaters and press. Museums, archives, and libraries were seized (the Copernicus Municipal Library was taken over on September 9), preventing the non-German population from using their collections.

On October 27, the police director in Toruń issued an order, which, among other things, imposed on the Polish population the obligation to yield the way to representatives of the German authorities and to bow to them by removing head coverings. It introduced the principle that in shops and marketplaces, German citizens would always have the privilege of being served out of turn, and also threatened that Polish women who were "harassing or attacking Germans" would be taken to brothels. In the same document, it was stated that "the streets belong to the victors, not to the vanquished", and "Poles who have not yet realized that they are the vanquished [...] and who will resist the above regulations will be subject to the severest punishment".

=== Organization of the apparatus of terror ===
On 26 October 1939, the military administration was officially abolished in the occupied territories. Toruń, along with its county, was incorporated into the Reich as part of the Bydgoszcz District of the Reichsgau Danzig-West Prussia division. Earlier, structures of German police, state, and party authorities had already been installed in the city and county. Due to rivalry between various factions within the Nazi elite, this process had a somewhat chaotic course. On September 9, Horst Zachrau, a civil servant from East Prussia, was appointed as the provisional mayor of Toruń. After a few days, he was replaced by Nieckau, who also was quickly removed from office. Around the same time, an unsuccessful attempt to subordinate the civilian administration of Toruń was made by Wilhelm Heymanns. Finally, on September 18, Walter Kiessling, the former lord mayor of Erfurt, who was brought to Toruń by the head of the civil administration of the 4th Army, assumed the office of the city commissioner. However, this last appointment met with opposition from the Nazi leader of the Free City of Danzig, Albert Forster, who had been appointed by Hitler to assume the position of Reichsstatthalter and Gauleiter of the Nazi Party in the Reichsgau Danzig-West Prussia division. At the end of October, Forster succeeded in removing Kiessling and replaced him with his protege, Franz Jakob (former lord mayor of Fürth). Jakob served as the lord mayor of Toruń until the final days of the occupation. From October 1939 to February 1941, he also held the position of district leader of the Nazi Party (kreisleiter).

From mid-September to 27 November 1939, the position of Landrat of Toruń County was held by Dr. Kipke, later replaced by Böse. The commandant of Toruń Fortress was Major General Eduard Klutmann, while the military commandant of the city, existing until 25 November 1939, was led by Captain Wolff. The position of police director was held in the first months of the occupation successively by SA-Oberführer Schulz-Sembten (from September 16 to early October 1939) and SS-Sturmbannführer Otto Weberstedt (from 12 October 1939, to February 1940).

Members of the Einsatzgruppen, i.e., special operational groups of the SD and Security Police, actively operated in the city and county, following the Wehrmacht divisions with the task of "combating all hostile elements to the Reich and Germans behind the fighting troops" and "apprehending politically uncertain persons". Initially, Toruń was in the operational zone of Einsatzgruppe IV. When this unit moved to central Poland, another operational group, Einsatzkommando 16 (EK 16), was introduced to the Gdańsk Pomerania. At the end of September 1939, one of the three units of EK 16 was stationed in Toruń, commanded by SS-Hauptsturmführer and criminal commissioner Hans-Joachim Leyer, who thereby became the first head of the Toruń Gestapo. The city also housed an independent SD office under the command of SS-Sturmbannführer Werner Böhm. Additionally, until 26 October 1939, a special police commission investigating cases of crimes against Volksdeutsche allegedly committed by Poles operated in Toruń. (Note: In the occupation lists of the German authorities, this commission is referred to as the "Special Commission of the Reich Criminal Police Office" (German: Sonderkommission des Reichskriminalamtes). They also state that the commissioner Dr. Ochs was at its helm. However, in a letter dated 26 October 1939, signed by SS-Obersturmführer and criminal commissioner Wilhelm Rehtfeldt, addressed to the commissioner of the city of Toruń, notifying the completion of the commission's work, the sender is listed as the "Special Commission of the Chief of the Security Police" (Sonderkommission des Chefs der Sicherheitspolizei). It has not been established whether two separate commissions with the same tasks were operating in Toruń at that time, or whether preserved German documents use different names for the same body (W czasach Polski Odrodzonej i okupacji niemieckiej (1920–1945) (2006, p. 532)). In Polish sources, the commission usually appears under the second of the aforementioned names, and Rehtfeldt is indicated as its chairman. Tadeusz Jaszowski and Czesław Sobecki also state that Rehtfeldt, due to his hatred towards Catholic clergy, was known as the "Bloody Vicar" (Blutvikar). Niemy świadek. Zbrodnie hitlerowskie w toruńskim Forcie VII i w lesie Barbarka (1971, p. 23), Barbarka. Miejsce niemieckich egzekucji Polaków z Torunia i okolic (październik–grudzień 1939) (2009, p. 56), Okupacja hitlerowska na Pomorzu Gdańskim w latach 1939–1945 (1979, p. 63).)

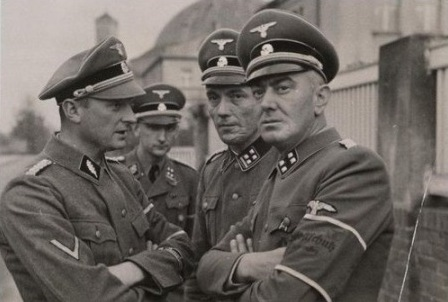
SS-Standartenführer Ludolf Jakob von Alvensleben (first from the left) along with other commanders of Selbstschutz inspectorates.

In 1939, Toruń was inhabited by 2,568 people of German nationality, which constituted 3.2% of the city's population. Toruń played an important role in the life of the German minority in Pomerania, hosting, among others, one of the branches of the Nazi Party in Poland (Landesgruppe NSDAP – Polen). In the autumn of 1939, many local Volksdeutsche actively engaged in establishing the occupational order. Already on September 8, the day after the city was occupied by the Wehrmacht, an auxiliary police force composed of local Germans (Hilfspolizei) was organized. In the second half of September, its members joined the ranks of the Selbstschutz, a police-like formation composed of Volksdeutsche, which Reichsführer-SS Heinrich Himmler ordered to organize in the occupied Polish territories. The position of leader of the Selbstschutz for the city of Toruń and Toruń County (Kreisführer) was assumed by SS-Sturmbannführer Helmut Kurt Zaporowicz, (Note: Zaporowicz, the son of a Prussian official, was born in Toruń. During the interwar period, he lived in the Free City of Danzig. In December 1939, he adopted his mother's maiden name – Görz. (Niemy świadek. Zbrodnie hitlerowskie w toruńskim Forcie VII i w lesie Barbarka (1971, p. 33), Barbarka. Miejsce niemieckich egzekucji Polaków z Torunia i okolic (październik–grudzień 1939) (2009, p. 63))) while the structures of the "Self-Defense" in Toruń itself were led by Stadtführer Rudolf Preuss (a local German, industrialist). Organizational-wise, the Toruń Selbstschutz was subordinated to the II Inspectorate of Selbstschutz, headquartered in Płutowo, covering the counties of Chełmno, Grudziądz, Lipno, Toruń, and Wąbrzeźno in terms of its operations. The position of inspectorate chief was held by SS-Standartenführer Ludolf Jakob von Alvensleben. (Note: Privately, he was the nephew of the commander of the Pomeranian Selbstschutz, SS-Oberführer Ludolf-Hermann von Alvensleben. (Barbarka. Miejsce niemieckich egzekucji Polaków z Torunia i okolic (październik–grudzień 1939) (2009, p. 50)))

From the letter that Preuss addressed to Mayor Jakob, it appears that the personnel of the Toruń Selbstschutz as of 20 October 1939, amounted to 256 members, including 158 full-time (paid) members. Members of the Selbstschutz were particularly dangerous to Poles due to their excellent knowledge of the terrain and local social relations. Acting within the ranks of this formation, local Germans had the opportunity to settle long-standing neighborhood disputes and scores. They often also took advantage of the opportunity to seize the property of arrested and murdered Poles.

== Intelligenzaktion in Toruń and Toruń County ==
=== Origins ===
German terror intensified sharply after the end of the September Campaign. It was primarily directed against representatives of the Polish intelligentsia, whom Hitler and the Nazis blamed for the policy of Polonization conducted in the Western Borderlands during the interwar period and regarded as the most serious obstacle to the rapid and complete Germanization of those territories. In accordance with the racist stereotype of the Pole prevailing in Nazi Germany, Nazi leaders believed that only the Polish intelligentsia possessed national consciousness, while the common people were concerned only with their daily lives and were indifferent to the fate of the state. For this reason, it was assumed that the extermination of the elites would allow the destruction of Polish national identity and transform Polish society into a passive, amorphous mass, serving at best as unskilled labour power for Nazi Germany. However, the Germans counted among the doomed intelligentsia not only individuals belonging to a certain social class due to their education but also all those active in social life and enjoying authority among their compatriots. Nazi decision-makers used the term "Polish leadership class" (Führungsschicht) to refer to this group of people. Its representatives were primarily considered to be: Catholic clergy, teachers, doctors, dentists, veterinarians, retired officers, officials, merchants, entrepreneurs, landowners, lawyers, writers, journalists, uniformed service personnel, graduates of higher and secondary schools, as well as members of organizations and associations promoting Polish identity – primarily the Polish Western Union, the Maritime and Colonial League, the Rifle Brotherhood, the Society of Insurgents and Soldiers, the Riflemen's Association Strzelec, and the Sokół movement.

In Toruń, the pretext for dealing with the Polish intelligentsia was provided by the events of the first days of the September Campaign. Based on the so-called elaboration on the immobilization, the Polish authorities interned approximately 600 representatives of the German minority from Toruń, Chełmża, and surrounding areas. Faced with the rapid advances of the German troops, a decision was made to evacuate the internees inland. On September 3, a column of prisoners set off towards Aleksandrów Kujawski. It consisted of about 540 interned Volksdeutsche and about 240 escorts – young boys from the Military Preparation, commanded by reserve captain Jan Drzewiecki. On one of the following nights, in the area of the village of Podzamcze, a shootout occurred, possibly caused by an attempt by some prisoners to escape. At least a dozen people were killed then; among the victims were also members of the escort (about fifty internees managed to escape under the cover of darkness). Finally, after thirteen days of walking, the column reached Warsaw. The interned Germans were imprisoned in the Citadel, from where they were released after the capitulation of the capital. Drzewiecki and his subordinates were later accused of cold-blooded murder of about 150 Volksdeutsche. (Note: The "death march to Łowicz" case was the subject of a showcase trial that took place in the spring of 1942 before the Sondergericht Bromberg. In the verdict sentencing Drzewiecki and his twenty companions to death, the court found that 49 Volksdeutsche were killed or wounded in the Podzamcze area. However, the German authorities were unable to identify any victim by name, which raises doubts about the accuracy of these calculations. (Niemy świadek. Zbrodnie hitlerowskie w toruńskim Forcie VII i w lesie Barbarka (1971, pp. 107–108), Terror i zbrodnia. Eksterminacja ludności polskiej i żydowskiej w rejencji bydgoskiej w latach 1939–1945 (1974, p. 249))) Goebbels' propaganda dubbed the evacuation of Toruń Germans as the "death march to Łowicz", and just like in the case of the so-called Bloody Sunday in Bydgoszcz, it presented it as a flagship example of crimes, supposedly perpetrated against Volksdeutsche residing in Poland.

=== Course of the massacre ===
From the first days of the occupation, residents of Toruń and neighboring villages fell victim to arrests. Members of the Selbstschutz guarding important communication routes intercepted refugees returning to their homes, especially former Polish Armed Forces soldiers, officials, and teachers. There was particularly fierce hunting for members of the Military Preparation who participated in the evacuation of interned Volksdeutsche. In September 1939, about 300 people were imprisoned in the Toruń's Okrąglak prison alone, of whom 282 could be identified by name. Among the detainees were seventeen women and six Redemptorists from the local monastery. After some time, some prisoners were released (including the mentioned monks); however, in October, many of them were arrested again.

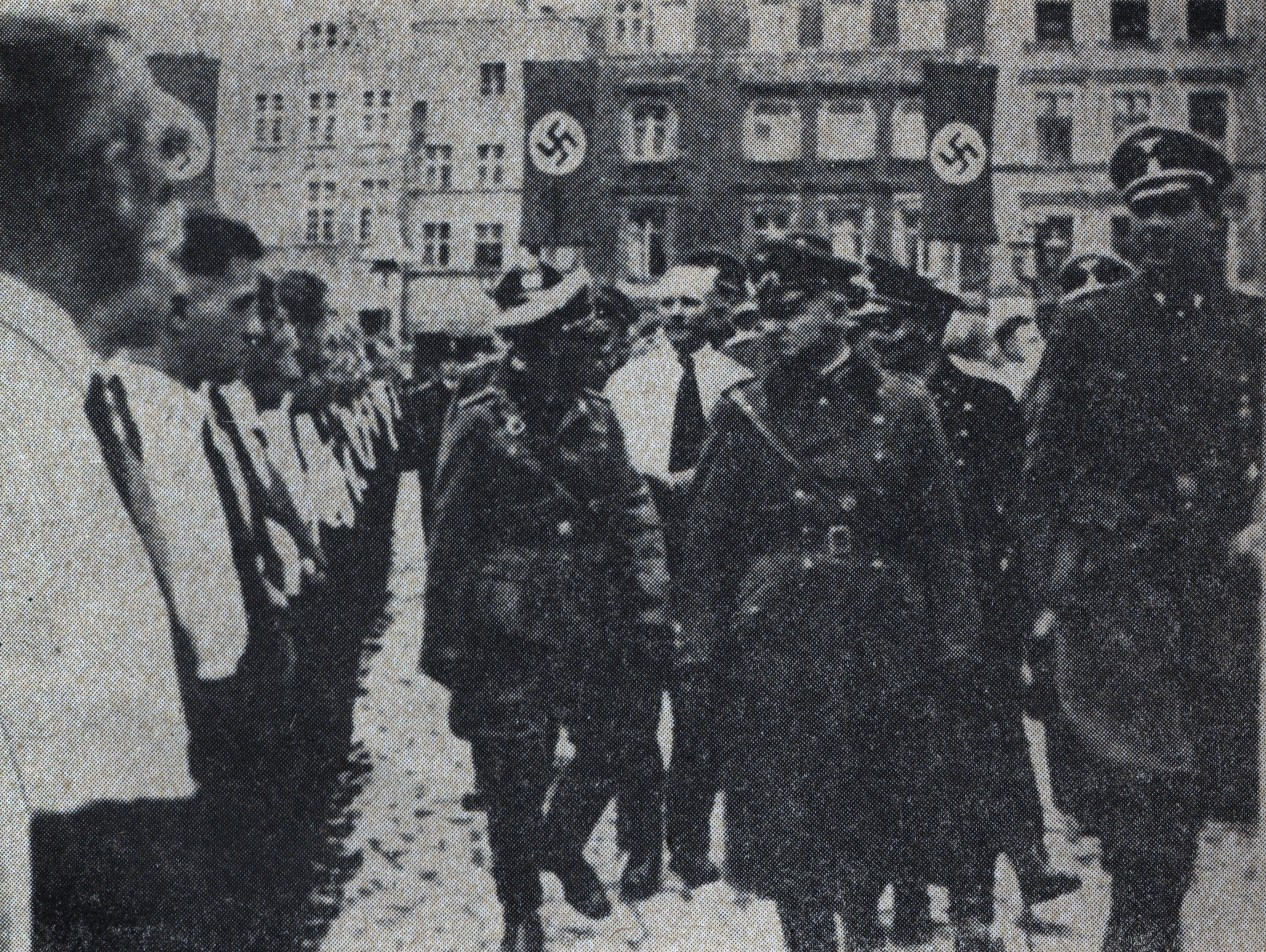
Review of the units of the Toruń Selbstschutz conducted by SS-Oberführer Ludolf-Hermann von Alvensleben (first from the right). In the photo, the commander of the Toruń Selbstschutz, Rudolf Preuss, can be seen (fourth from the right, in a white shirt).

The large-scale operation against the Polish intelligentsia began in the second half of October. The signal for its commencement was the visit made to Toruń on October 15 by the leader of the Pomeranian Selbstschutz, SS-Oberführer Ludolf-Hermann von Alvensleben. During a grand assembly for members of the urban and district structures of the "Self-Defense", Alvensleben delivered a speech containing the following words:

We will never forget the wrongs done to us on this German soil. Only someone belonging to a lower race could commit such deeds. If you, my Selbstschutz people, are men, then no Pole in this German city will ever dare to speak Polish again. Nothing has ever been built with softness and weakness. You must be relentless and remove everything that is not German. However, you must also realize that it was not the Polish nation as a whole, but the Polish intelligentsia, who incited this war. This is where the spiritual instigators of this war are to be found.

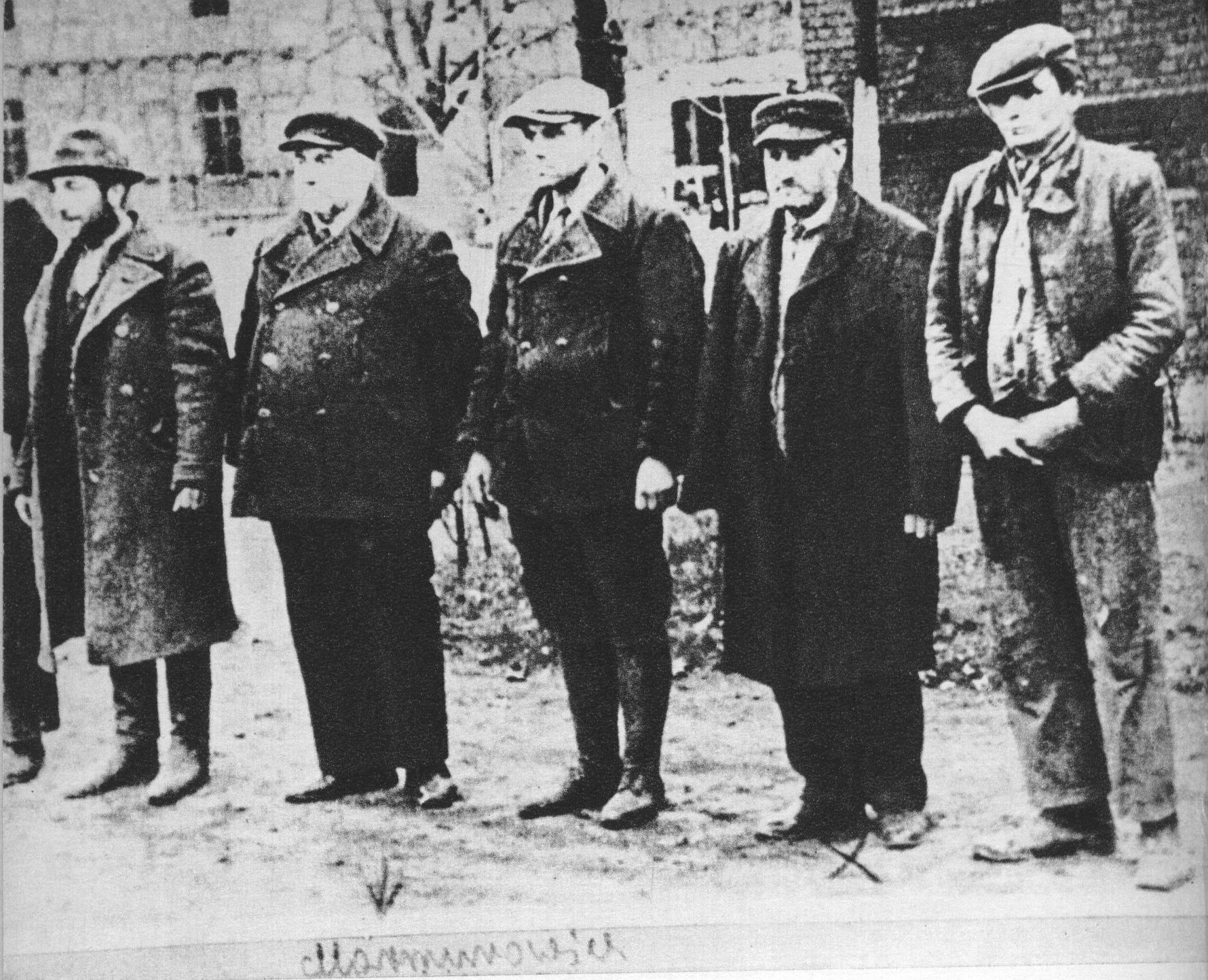
Poles imprisoned in Fort VII of Toruń Fortress

From October 17th to 21st, a large-scale dragnet took place in Toruń, carried out under the pretext of searching for weapons but in reality targeting "politically uncertain Polish elements". It involved 420 Wehrmacht soldiers, 25 field gendarmerie officers, 75 members of the Ordnungspolizei, 120 Selbstschutz members, as well as an unspecified number of Gestapo and Kriminalpolizei officers. The city was divided into five sectors, each surrounded by a double cordon of Wehrmacht soldiers. (Note: Friedrich V., a member of the Ordnungspolizei, who served in Toruń in the autumn of 1939, claimed that Wehrmacht soldiers accompanied policemen during searches and arrests. The selection of those arrested was allegedly carried out by the SD and Selbstschutz. (Einsatzgruppen w Polsce (2009, p. 184))) At the same time, two search groups were formed, led by police captains Jokscha and Taube, systematically combing the streets and homes, arresting individuals whose names appeared on previously prepared wanted lists, (Note: Even before the war, the German intelligence prepared the Special Prosecution Book-Poland (German: Sonderfahndungsbuch Polen), which included the names of Poles "distinguished in national conflicts". Based on this book, proscription lists were prepared for Einsatzgruppen. After the German troops entered Polish territories, these lists were regularly verified and supplemented (Einsatzgruppen w Polsce (2009, p. 14), Był rok 1939. Operacja niemieckiej policji bezpieczeństwa w Polsce. Intelligenzaktion (2009, p. 45)). From the testimony of the policeman Friedrich V., it is known that members of the Ordnungspolizei were tasked with checking the population lists of Toruń and compiling a separate list of personal data of Polish merchants and intelligentsia. (Einsatzgruppen w Polsce (2009, p. 184))) as well as all Polish men aged 16 to 20. The detainees were first taken to temporary detention centers, where preliminary selection was carried out. Then, those singled out from the crowd were directed to the internment camp set up by the Germans in Fort VII of the Toruń Fortress. The selection criteria were very arbitrary. The mere fact that the arrested person earned over 300 zlotys per month before the war or was involved in any socio-political organization could be the reason for internment. People who were involved in independence activities between 1914 and 1921 were also detained. Even publicly singing Polish patriotic songs could be a reason for arrest.

In parallel with the dragnet in Toruń, mass arrests were carried out in Chełmża. The local leader of the Selbstschutz, Botho Eberhardt, resorted to trickery for this purpose. He sent written summons to selected individuals, primarily teachers, officials, and activists, with the following content:

You are summoned to appear at the Chełmża train station on October 17th in the afternoon at 3 o'clock. You will be transported to a training camp /duration 2 weeks/. Please prepare underwear, cash, and food for this period.

At the appointed time, about 70 men showed up at the train station. Local Selbstschutz members loaded them into railway wagons amid insults and beatings, then transported them to Toruń. There, the detainees were personally taken over by SS-Sturmbannführer Zaporowicz, whose subordinates drove the prisoners to Fort VII, beating them with whips and rifle butts along the way.

After October 17th, numerous arrests also took place in the villages and settlements of the Toruń County. Those detained there were temporarily held in municipal jails or even in the cellars of private farms before being taken to the camp at Fort VII. It happened that local Selbstschutz squads refrained from transporting detainees to Toruń and instead murdered them on the spot. Such crimes occurred, for example, in the forest near Lulkowo, where on October 9th, six Poles were shot dead. The victims of the execution were: Jan Podwójski (the mayor of Brąchnowo), Feliks Gzella (the school principal in Brąchnowo), Alfons Reiwer (the school principal in Łubianka), Franciszek Podwójski (the municipality secretary of Smolno), Walenty Woziwoda (the municipality secretary of Łubianka), and his brother Stanisław.

Another wave of arrests hit Toruń and Chełmża on November 9th–10th, on the eve of the Polish Independence Day. On November 10th, about 50 Polish teachers, who had shown up for a supposed "conference" at the Gestapo headquarters on Bydgoska Street following a summons received two days earlier, were deceitfully arrested in Toruń (six people were quickly released, the rest were detained at Fort VII). Some sources indicate that on November 21st, a similar tactic was employed again by the ortsführer Botho Eberhardt against the remnants of the Chełmża intelligentsia. After this last action, the number of arrests gradually began to decrease.

== Internment camp at Fort VII ==
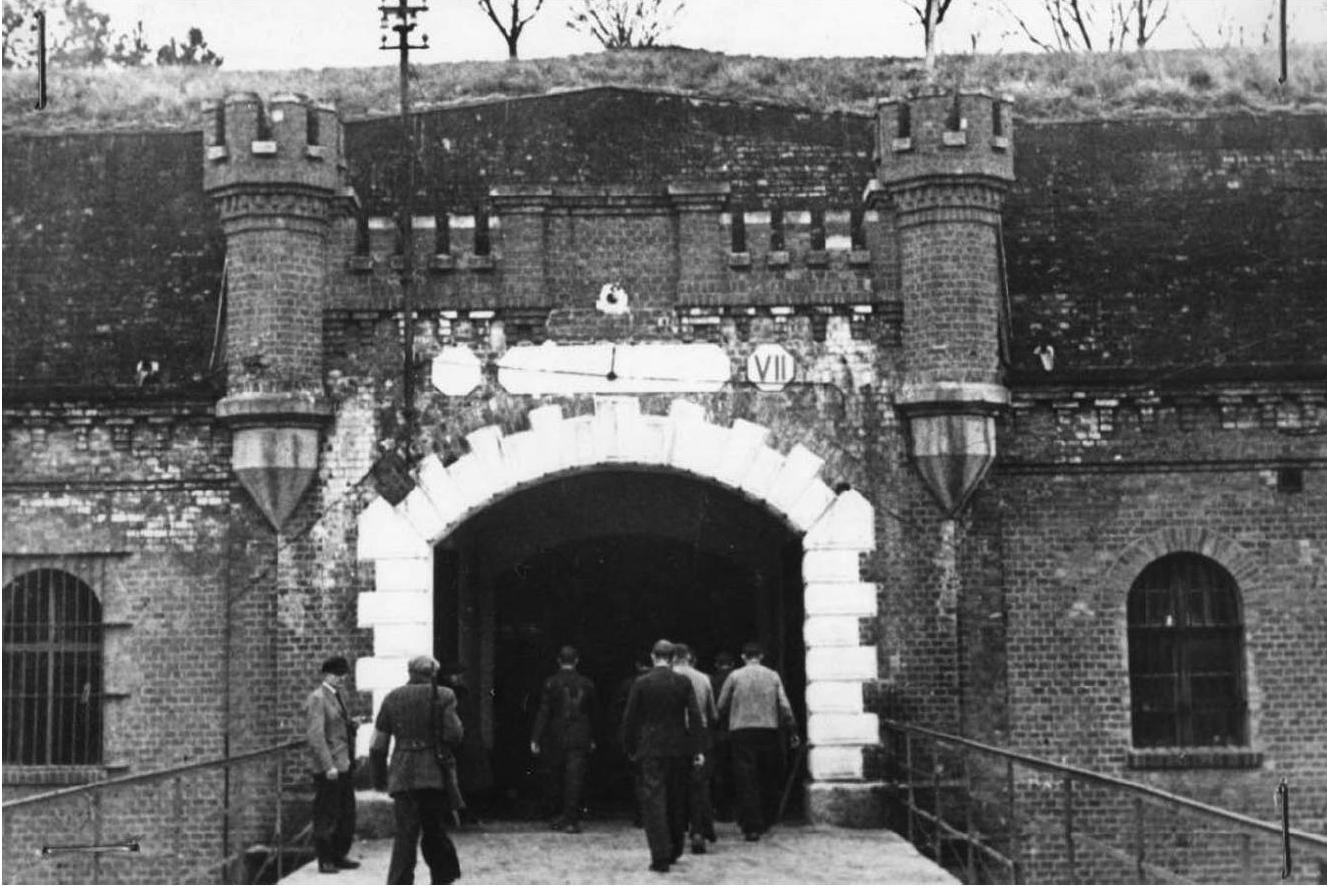
Internment camp in Fort VII. In the photo, the main gate, guards from Selbstschutz, and Polish prisoners are visible.

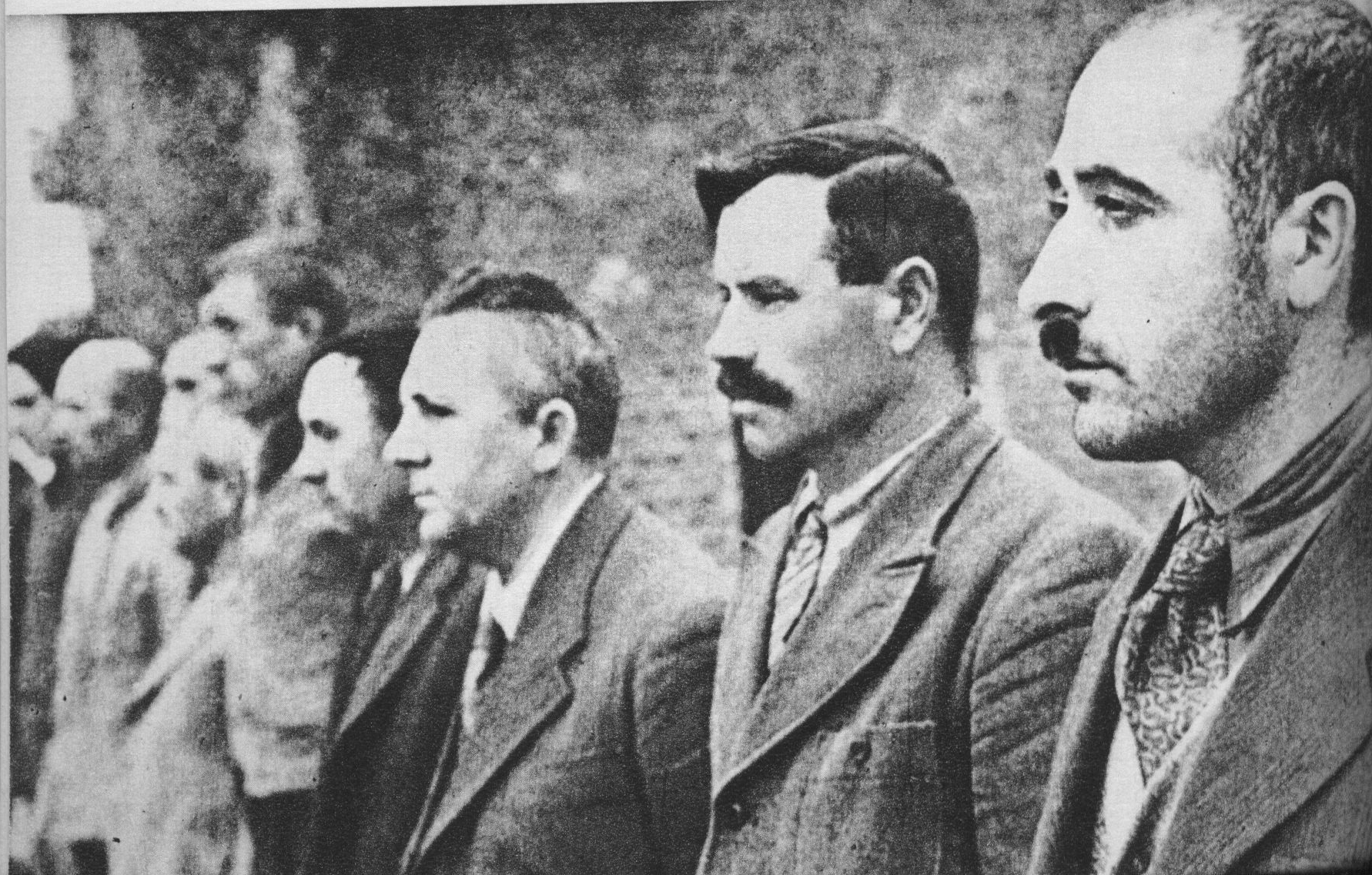
Prisoners during roll call.

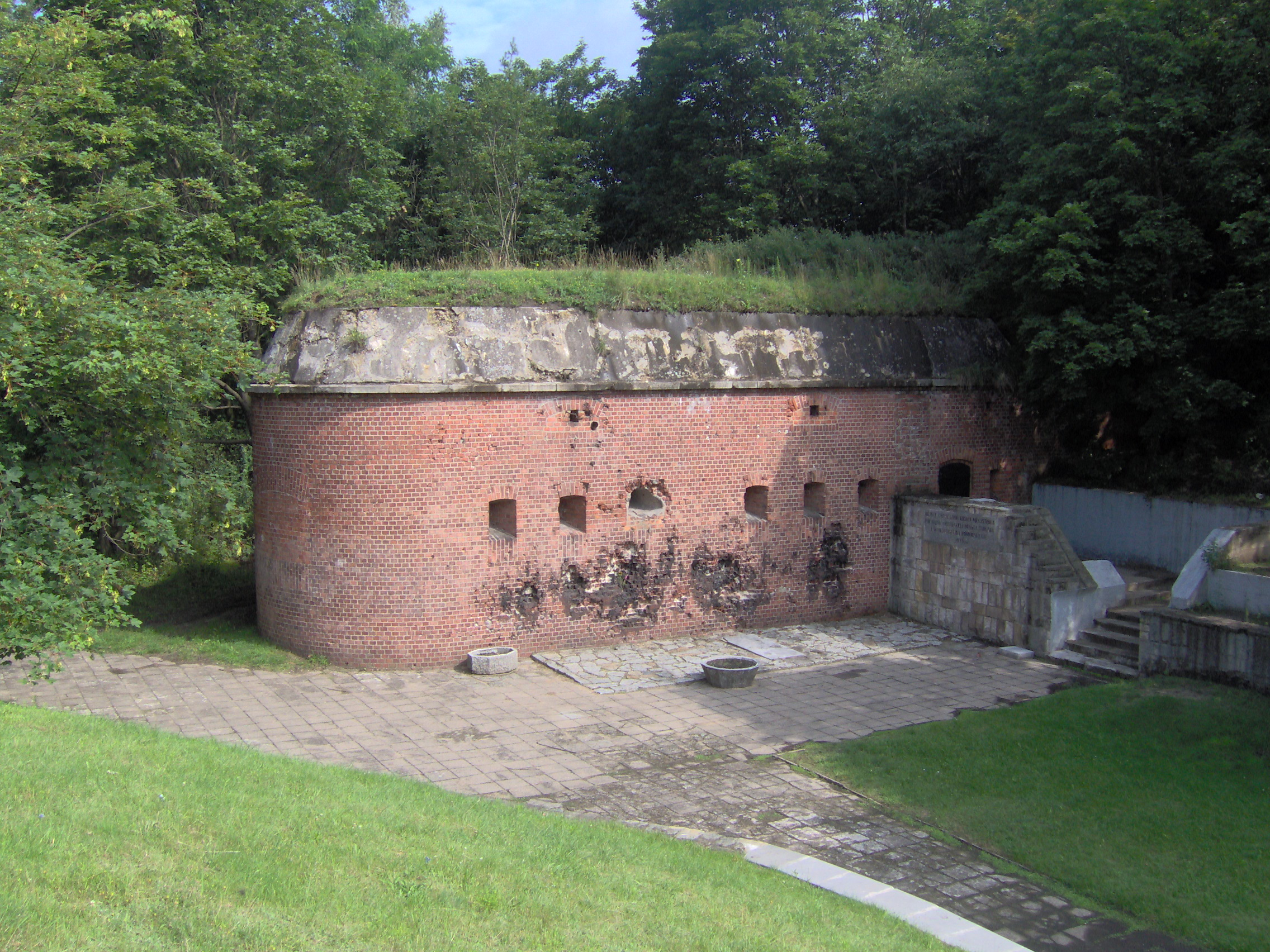
The left caponier of Fort VII – a symbolic wall of death.

The people arrested in Toruń were initially held in the pre-war prison located at 53 Piekary Street, commonly known as the Okrąglak. The guards there were soldiers of the Wehrmacht. The prisoners in the Okrąglak were used as forced laborers, including tasks like cleaning up the city, and twice for physical labor in the identification of bodies, conducted by a German commission in the New Town Market Square. The prisoners working on the repair of the destroyed bridge over the Vistula river were in the worst situation. They were forced to carry burdens beyond their strength and work in the river's current, while the German escort constantly abused and insulted them. Toruń baker Olszewski received 18 bayonet wounds in one day. Working in these conditions caused extreme exhaustion among the prisoners, and there were even cases of suicide. In the Okrąglak, there were also murders of prisoners. On September 15, in the prison cellar, Ludwik Makowski was killed – a master tailor, city councilor, and social activist, who had been appointed commander of the Toruń Citizens' Guard by President Leon Raszeja on 4 September 1939.

Around October 15, all the prisoners from the Okrąglak were transferred to an internment camp (German: Internierungslager), which the occupying authorities organized in Fort VII of the Toruń Fortress. This facility was located on the outskirts of the city, at the intersection of Polna Street and Szosa Okrężna. From the German perspective, the fort was an ideal place to hold prisoners because access from the outside was difficult, and the possibilities of escape were very limited. In the context of the planned roundup of Toruń's intelligentsia, it was also crucial that the fort, unlike the Okrąglak, could accommodate hundreds of prisoners, and its peripheral location allowed their fate to be kept secret. Konrad Ciechanowski speculated that the transfer of prisoners from the Okrąglak to Fort VII was initiated by the military authorities or at least with their acceptance and assistance. It may also have been at the request of the Reich Ministry of Justice, which at that time was taking over all pre-war prison facilities in annexed Polish territories.

Initially, the internees remained under the supervision of the Wehrmacht. However, the SS and the police had unlimited access to the camp. On October 26, concurrently with the abolition of military administration, Fort VII was officially taken over by the Selbstschutz. The camp commander was Karl Friedrich Strauss, a local German and a carpenter, while his deputy was Bronisław (Bruno) Schönborn. Additionally, the camp staff included individuals such as Wiese (a baker by profession), Karst, Denni Deter, Hoffenicz, Broese, Betinger, Schulz, Heise, and Tobar.

Starting from October 17, the number of prisoners began to systematically increase. As a result of the October raid alone, between 600 and 1200 residents of Toruń and the surrounding area were imprisoned in the casemates of the fort. Prisoners from Selbstschutz units from the Chełmno, Lipno, and Wąbrzeźno counties, and even from the Brodnica and Rypin counties, began to be directed to the Internierungslager. Fort VII thus became the central prison for the entire Inspectorate II of Selbstschutz. Polish historians estimate that the fort's cells held between 700 and 1000–1200, or even 1500 people at once. The total number of prisoners who passed through the Toruń Internierungslager is estimated by Konrad Ciechanowski to be 3,000. Among them were numerous Polish women (including three nuns and two 14-year-old girls), about 40 Catholic priests from the Toruń County, a group of Catholic priests from the Lipno County, a group of teachers from the Chełmno County, as well as at least several dozen Jewish women and several dozen Jews.

The conditions in the camp were very harsh. Cells intended for 6–12 soldiers usually had to accommodate between 50 and 80 prisoners. Men slept on sparse straw, with at most their own coats for cover. Slightly better conditions prevailed in the women's cells, where there were a few pieces of equipment. Poor sanitary conditions led to widespread lice infestation, and many prisoners also suffered from scabies. The food was far from sufficient, as prisoners received only black coffee and kommissbrot for breakfast, a fat-free barley soup with a small amount of potatoes for lunch, and only black coffee for dinner. Packages from families were the only thing preventing prisoners from total hunger. However, a positive aspect was that prisoners were no longer forced into exhausting physical labor. This also had negative consequences, as initially only a few people designated for camp work (e.g., chopping wood for fuel) could leave the cells. Daily walks were only allowed when Commandant Strauss realized that prolonged confinement combined with poor nutrition was having a detrimental effect on the prisoners' health.

The camp staff often treated the inmates in a very brutal manner. Commandant Strauss, in particular, was noted for his cruelty, both physically and psychologically, towards the prisoners. For example, he announced to the internees that they would "soon receive their deserved punishment" for alleged persecution of Volksdeutsche in September 1939. The walks ordered by Strauss took the form of exhausting "gymnastics", during which the guards beat, tormented, and humiliated the prisoners. On one occasion, a prisoner who demanded soap and toothpaste due to the dire sanitary conditions was beaten unconscious and then forced to clean the latrines. Generally, there were no cases of mistreatment of Polish women, but Jewish female prisoners were constantly subjected to beatings.

== Extermination in Barbarka ==
From the first days of the camp's existence, a special commission composed of Gestapo officers and members of the local Selbstschutz operated within it. Based on interrogation results (often accompanied by beatings) and the analysis of questionnaires and biographies compiled by the prisoners, the commission decided the fate of each inmate. Sometimes, the commission ruled for the release of a prisoner, which often meant deportation along with their entire family to the General Government. (Note: Tadeusz Jaszowski and Czesław Sobecki maintained that cases of releasing prisoners were "rare in practice". On the other hand, Konrad Ciechanowski claimed that as many as 800 people were released from the camp at Fort VII. (Niemy świadek. Zbrodnie hitlerowskie w toruńskim Forcie VII i w lesie Barbarka (1971, p. 40), Stutthof: hitlerowski obóz koncentracyjny (1988, p. 72))) However, the vast majority of individuals imprisoned in the fort faced execution or deportation to concentration camps. For this reason, the prisoners referred to the aforementioned body as the "death commission" (German: Mordkommission). According to findings by Polish investigators and historians, the commission included individuals such as SS-Sturmbannführer Zaporowicz, camp commandant Strauss, lawyer Kohnert, engineer Wiese, pharmacist Rudi Heininger, car agent Scholtz, gravedigger Pomerenke, carpenter Paul Heise, Landbund president Bachmann, as well as the Heyer brothers (merchants) and the Wallis brothers. It also happened that the commander of Inspectorate II Selbstschutz, SS-Standartenführer Ludolf Jakob von Alvensleben, participated in the "selections". He is said to have personally ordered the execution of lawyer Paweł Ossowski, with whom he had a personal feud dating back to the early 1920s. (Note: Paweł Ossowski, as the starosta of Chełmno County, handled administrative matters related to the sale of the Alvensleben estate in Płutowo and granted permission for them to leave Poland. (Barbarka. Miejsce niemieckich egzekucji Polaków z Torunia i okolic (październik–grudzień 1939) (2009, p. 63)))

The forest of Barbarka, located approximately 7 km from Toruń, became the site of executions for the prisoners of Fort VII. The first mass execution took place there on October 28, just two days after the camp was taken over by the Selbstschutz. According to the testimony of Dr. Kazimierz Frąckowski, several groups of prisoners totaling 130 individuals were taken to their deaths on that day. Among the victims were six priests from the Toruń County (Father Czesław Lisoń, Father Roman Gdaniec, Father Stanisław Główczewski, Father Jan Pronobis, Father Antoni Januszewski, Father Mieczysław Mencel), lawyers Paweł Ossowski and Stanisław Strzyżowski, teachers Leon Filcek and Franciszek Żmich, Mayor Ćwikliński from Gostkowo, Mayor Jan Monarski from Chełmża, Jan Brzeski (owner of a basket weaving workshop and councilor of the City Council in Chełmża), as well as two women.

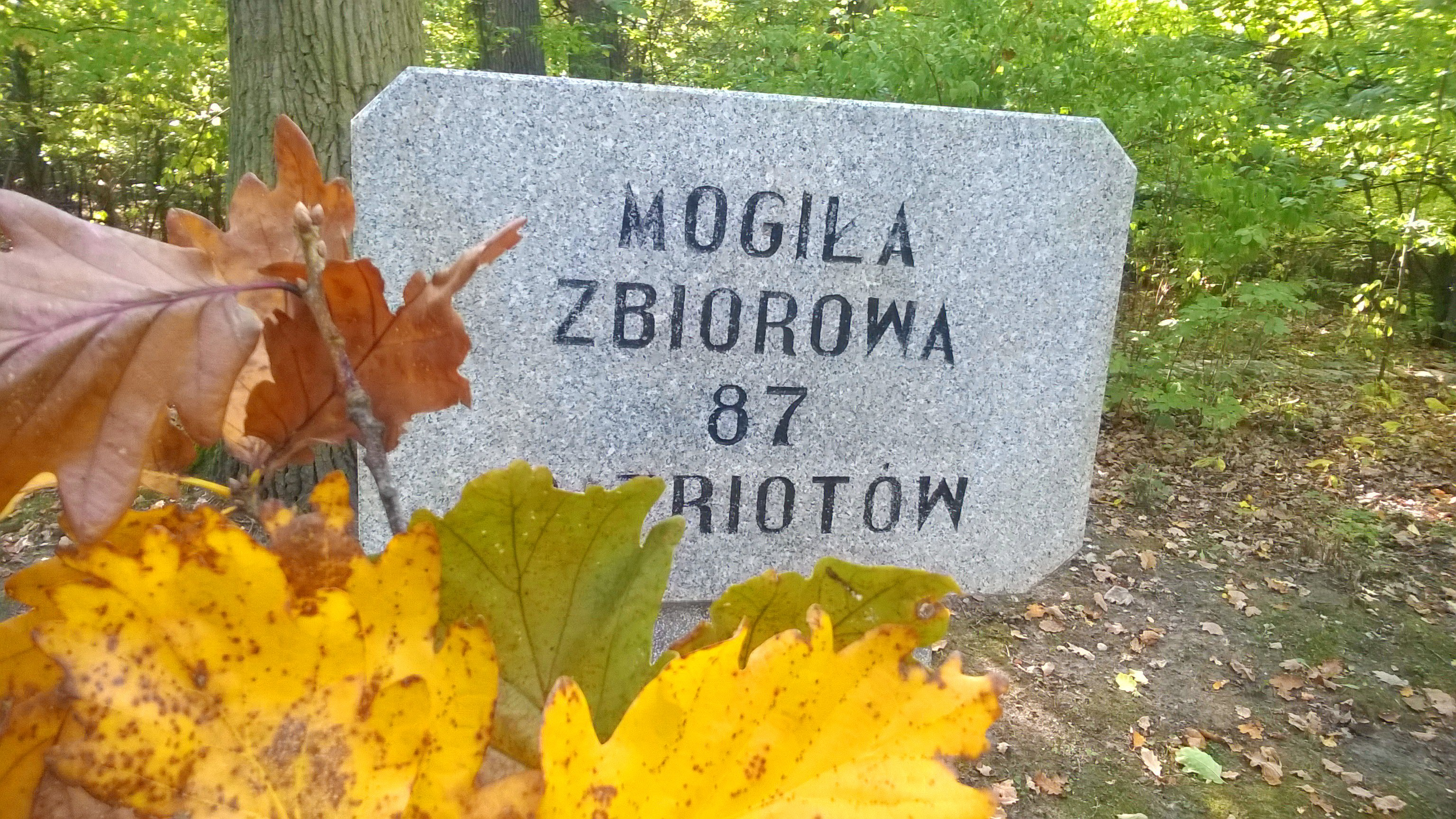
Mass grave in the Barbarka forest.

Further mass executions took place in November and December. Witnesses testified that during this period, executions were carried out once a week, sometimes even twice a week. Typically, each time, at least several dozen people were shot. (Note: Barbara Bojarska stated that the largest execution, which allegedly claimed the lives of around 200 people, took place on the day of Forster's visit to Toruń, i.e., November 2nd (Eksterminacja inteligencji polskiej na Pomorzu Gdańskim (wrzesień–grudzień 1939) (1972, p. 75)). On the other hand, Pastor Richard Otto Dey, who served in Toruń in the autumn of 1939, quoted rumors indicating that at the end of September 1939, up to 400 Poles were executed in Barbarka. This execution was said to have occurred after the solemn burial of 40 Volksdeutsche killed during the September Campaign (Einsatzgruppen w Polsce (2009, p. 150)). However, these pieces of information are not confirmed by other sources regarding the Barbarka massacre.) Witness Franciszek Komar stated that in November, executions took place every Wednesday, specifically on November 8th (42 victims), November 15th (approximately 65 victims), November 22nd (approximately 75 victims), and November 29th (approximately 150 victims). It is also known that six prisoners were shot on December 6th, the first Wednesday of that month.

The murders were usually carried out according to a consistent pattern. Before the execution, the condemned were gathered in cell No. 22 (the "death cell"), where they were stripped of their outer clothing and valuables. Sometimes their heads were also shaved. Some witnesses reported that subsequently, the prisoners were taken to the so-called "dungeon" where they had to wait for transportation to the execution site. During this time, they were no longer given food. The victims, dressed only in their underwear or lightly clothed at most, were transported to the place of execution in covered trucks belonging to the Toruń-based company Jaugsch. These vehicles had previously been used to transport bacon, hence the saying in the camp "the bacon has arrived", meaning that an execution would take place soon. The condemned were shot in the forest over previously dug graves. Jan Sziling states that initially, special SS commandos from Bydgoszcz carried out the executions, while the Selbstschutz was responsible for escorting the transports and securing the execution site. Starting from November, almost exclusively members of the Selbstschutz were part of the execution squads. The executions were often directed by Commandant Strauss. (Note: Strauss allegedly declared to the prisoners of Fort VII one day that "all priests, teachers, judges, lawyers, doctors, and students will be completely eradicated as leaders of Polish society, so that the Pomeranian land will be restored to its eternal, Germanic character". (Eksterminacja inteligencji polskiej na Pomorzu Gdańskim (wrzesień–grudzień 1939) (1972, p. 113)))

The Germans sought to keep the crime secret. Prisoners and the local population were not informed about the issued death sentences or about the executions themselves. Mass graves were camouflaged. Families of the victims were not given information about the fate of their loved ones, or they were falsely informed that the relative had been transferred to another camp, sent to forced labor, or resettled to the General Government. An exception was made only in the case of the execution carried out on December 6, when the fact that six Poles were shot was made public (one of the victims was Antoni Pasternacki – a civil servant, and a corporal in the Polish Army). Polish sources state that the reason for this execution was indicated by the Germans as the alleged insult of an SA member on one of the streets of Toruń. However, different information about the public execution conducted during this period is provided by German sources. Specifically, a document prepared by one of the Nazi officials indicates that the alleged "five local professional criminals" were publicly shot on November 27 due to shots fired by unknown perpetrators towards the apartment occupied by a Wehrmacht lieutenant (as a result of this incident, no one was harmed). The retaliatory execution was personally ordered by Gauleiter Albert Forster.

Despite the precautions taken by the Germans, the crimes committed in Barbarka quickly ceased to be a secret. The fate of their companions was known to the prisoners of Fort VII, who observed the departing transports from the camp, worked on sorting the clothing of the victims, or were forced to work on digging mass graves (the latter sometimes witnessed the executions). Occasionally, news of the executions reached the prisoners due to indiscretion by guards or members of the execution squad. Relatives of the prisoners, who kept vigil outside the walls of the fort, also had the opportunity to observe the convict transports. Some victims managed to throw out scraps of paper with their names and farewell messages from the vehicles.

Prisoners were summoned to the "examination room" [...]. We counted – the first one did not return, the second one did, the third and fourth did not, and so on until six. We survivors were given shovels to dig a grave for those six to be shot. The execution was led by Karl Strauss himself. The convicts were transported to the woods. Their mouths were sealed with plaster or lime so they wouldn't shout "Long live Poland!". It is difficult to describe this scene directly. Despite hunger, we could not eat for three days. – memories of Eugeniusz Horak

Walenty Kluska and Bolesław Koc, Polish forestry workers working in Barbarka, became important witnesses to the crimes. Once, Kluska encountered a man in the forest (surname unknown) who managed to escape from the execution site during the massacre. Upon learning from him what the gunshots, screams, and singing coming from the place of supposed military drills really meant, both workers attempted to locate the scene of the crime. Soon, in unit 24 of the forestry, they found trees with traces of bullet holes and graves with shallowly buried bodies, which the Germans tried to conceal with freshly planted saplings. One day, hidden behind bushes, Kluska also witnessed a mass execution.

Walenty Kluska [...] saw how six men arrived by car with shovels accompanied by two guards with rifles. After digging the pit and leaving, two cars approached, from one of which six men in civilian clothes got out, and from the other, six uniformed individuals. They were lined up facing the grave, after which the uniformed individuals fired shots at them, causing them to fall directly into the grave. The victims were finished off with shots fired into the grave from pistols. After the execution, these individuals filled the grave, and the remaining earth that did not fit into the grave was loaded onto a car. The grave was then disguised by covering it with pine needles and planting small trees. – official summary of an excerpt from Walenty Kluska's testimony

=== Victims ===
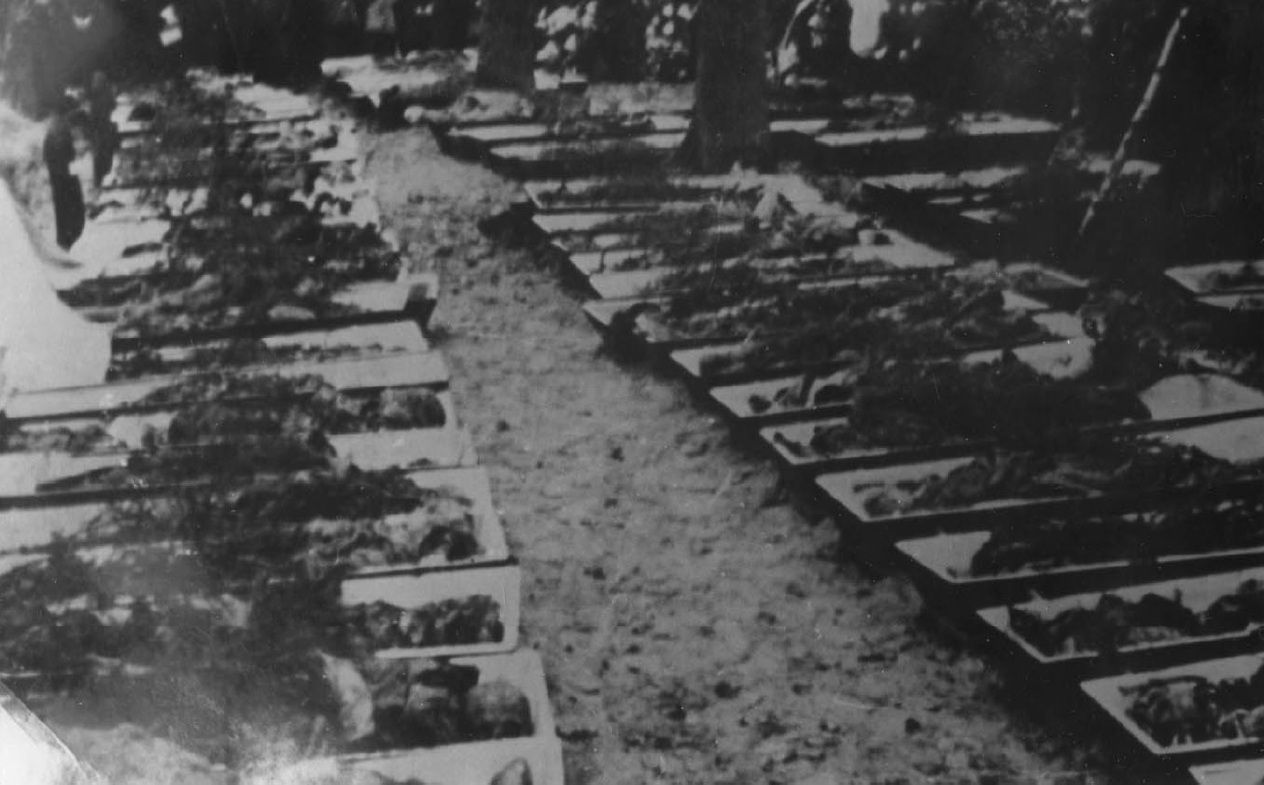
The bodies of the victims exhumed in October 1946.

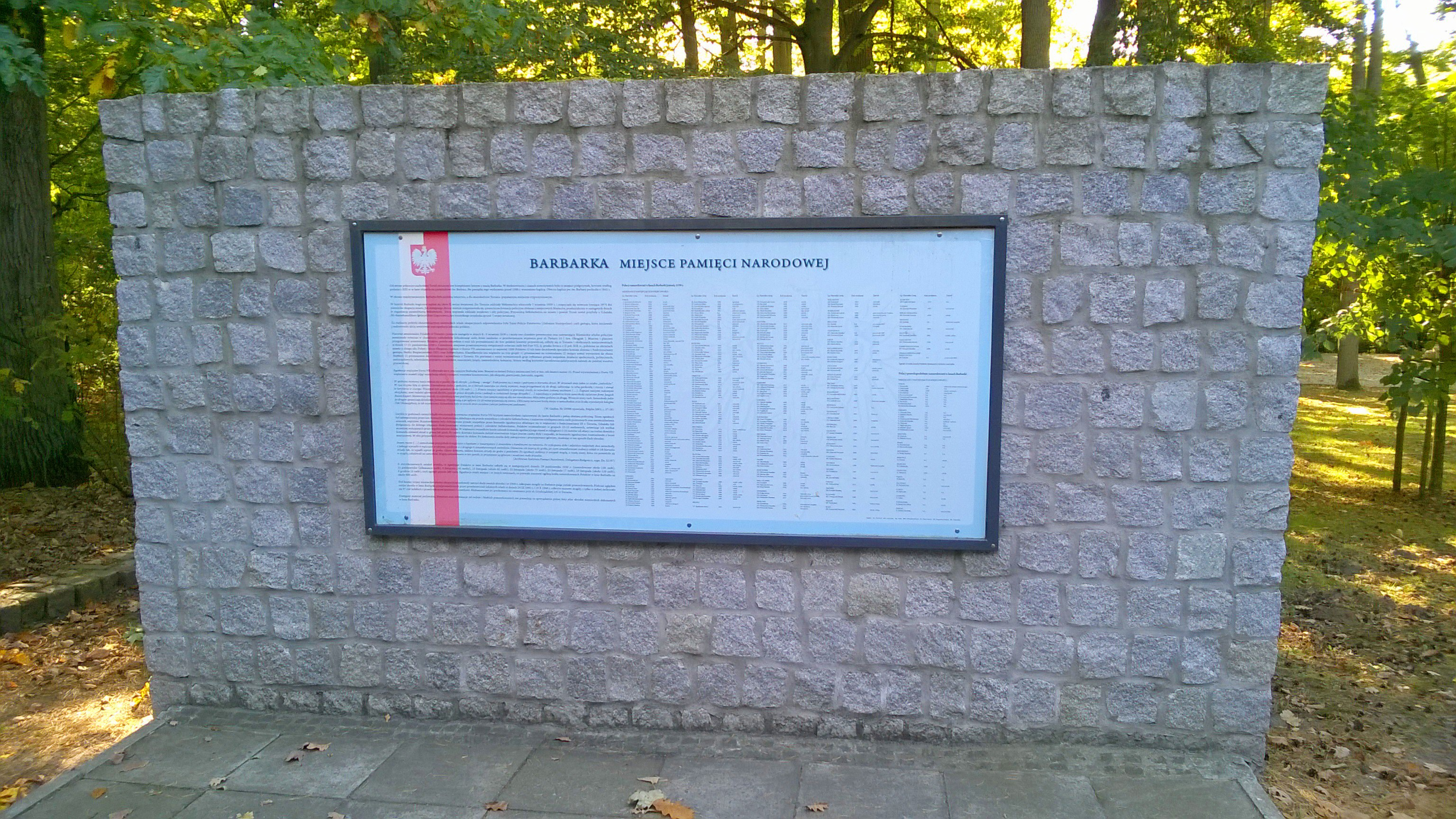
The national memorial site in Barbarka. A plaque with the names of those murdered.

Due to the Germans' efforts to conceal the traces of the crime, the number of victims can only be estimated. Most Polish sources state that around 600 people were shot in Barbarka in the autumn of 1939. However, some historians and researchers are inclined to estimate the number of victims at over 1000, 1100, or even 1200.

The first comprehensive list of victims, containing 260 names, was compiled by Judge Leon Gayda from the District Commission for the Investigation of Nazi Crimes in Bydgoszcz. It was published by Tadeusz Jaszowski and Czesław Sobecki in their 1971 book titled The Silent Witness: Nazi Crimes in Toruń's Fort VII and Barbarka Forest. Lists of victims' names were also published in Włodzimierz Jastrzębski's monograph titled Terror and Crime: Extermination of Polish and Jewish Population in the Bydgoszcz Region 1939–1945 in 1974, as well as in the Register of Places and Facts of Crimes Committed by the Nazi Occupier on Polish Territories 1939–1945 (register for the Toruń Voivodeship, published in 1983) by the Chief Commission for the Prosecution of Crimes against the Polish Nation. However, the authors of these lists did not completely avoid mistakes, as some names included belonged to individuals who perished in different places and times, or even survived the war.

The verification of the named list of victims of the crimes in Barbarka was undertaken by Jan Sziling and Sylwia Grochowina, whose findings were published in the book Barbarka: The Site of German Executions of Poles from Toruń and Its Vicinity, released in 2009. The list compiled by them contains the names of 298 individuals, including 15 women. According to the research by Sziling and Grochowina, 81 identified victims originated from Toruń, 32 from Chełmża, thirteen from Brzeczka, ten each from Grębocin, Skąpe, Skłudzewo, and Złotoria, nine from Gostkowo and Zelgno, eight from Grzywna, seven each from Brzoza and Czarnowo, and six each from Kamionki, Łubianka, and Toporzysko. The remaining victims hailed from 44 other localities. If it comes to the criteria of profession, among the identified victims were 91 farmers, 58 laborers, 36 craftsmen, 31 teachers, 17 railway workers, and 15 intellectual workers. The authors emphasized that this is not a comprehensive list of victims. Among those murdered were married couples, siblings, as well as fathers and sons. The youngest identified victim was 11-year-old Jan Kotlarek, and the oldest was 72-year-old Jan Brzeski.

Among the victims of the German terror, whose deaths in Barbarka were confirmed by Sziling and Grochowina, were:

- Local government officials and state administration employees: Jan Berwid (retired forester, former inspector of the State Forests Directorate in Toruń), Stefan Bogusz (engineer of the Water Management Board in Toruń), Franciszek Bosiacki (clerk from Toruń), Jan Brzeski (owner of a basket weaving company, councilor of the Municipal Board in Chełmża), Franciszek Cieszyński (wójt of Złotów), Stanisław Cywiński (councilor of the Turzno municipality, farmer), Józef Czwojda (forester from Cichoradz), Ćwikliński (wójt of Gostkowo), Otton Dehmel (clerk from Chełmża), Paweł Głowiński (sołtys of Brzeczka, farmer), Józef Kaniewski (municipal clerk, residing in Chełmża), Stanisław Karmiński (sołtys of Złotów, farmer and blacksmith), Jan Kawa (sołtys of Gostkowo, farmer), Władysław Kröning (sołtys of Brzoza, owner of an estate), Józef Kwiatkowski (sołtys of Otłoczyn, farmer), Wiktor Leśniewicz (deputy mayor of Chełmża, retired school inspector), Karol Majewski (clerk at the brewery in Ciechocinek, councilor, trade union activist), Jan Monarski (mayor of Gmina Chełmża, retired teacher), Bronisław Murawski (sołtys of Złotoria, farmer), Józef Nowak (branch office manager of the Toruń City Council in the left-bank part of the city, social activist), Józef Padykuła (farmer from Łubianka, councilor), Antoni Pasternacki (employee of the Water Management Board, former sergeant of the Polish Army), Franciszek Puszakowski (sołtys of Silno, owner of a shop), Józef Reza (wójt of Turzno), Ignacy Styczeń (councilor of the Turzno municipality, president of the volunteer fire department, farmer), Konstanty Wieczorek (owner of a volleyball workshop in Toruń, ensign of the Rifle Association, councilor of the Toruń-Podgórz district), Julian Wiśniewski (city secretary in Chełmża), Mieczysław Ziółkowski (clerk of the State Forests Directorate in Toruń).
- Teachers: Jan Adamczak (teacher from Wymysłowo), Alojzy Aleksandrzak (teacher from Brzoza), Antoni Bartkowiak (teacher from Grzegorz), Antoni Bączkowski (school principal in Zelgno), Apoloniusz Bębnista (school principal in Czarnowo), Władysław Dąbrowski (school principal in Kaszczorek), Feliks Dolatowski (teacher from Toruń), Leon Filcek (sołtys of Świerczynek, head of the local school), Władysław Jaroszyk (school principal in Turzno), Władysław Jasiński (teacher from Gronowo), Stanisława Jaworska (teacher from Wrzosy, ZHP instructor), Stefan Kałwa (teacher from Zelgno), Stanisław Kowalski (school principal in Przysiek, member of Strzelec), Roman Leśny (teacher, regional instructor of extracurricular education, residing in Toruń), Franciszek Litkiewicz (school principal in Kamionki, social activist), Kazimiera Maćkowiak (school principal in Złotoria), Benedykt Olszewski (teacher from Toruń), Józef Oślizło (teacher from Chełmża), Witold Owsianowski (school principal in Rogówek), Wanda Palenica (teacher from Kamionki, scout leader), Bronisław Pliszka (teacher from Zelgno), Władysław Rożek (school principal in Chełmża, social activist), Józef Sobala (teacher from Skłudzewo), Józef Sowiński (school inspector from Toruń), Bronisław Szczukowski (teacher from Gostków), Jan Świtajski (school principal in Młyniec, reserve officer), Jan Wiśniewski (school principal in Toruń), Wacław Włostowski (teacher and social activist from Przeczno), Edward Włośniewski (school principal in Zajączkowo), Franciszek Żmich (school principal in Chełmża).
- Lawyers: Jerzy Boldt (legal secretary from Chełmża), Ludwik Niedziałkowski (court secretary from Chełmża), Paweł Ossowski (lawyer, Doctor of Law, first county governor of Chełmno in the Second Polish Republic, senator of the Republic of Poland), Stanisław Strzyżowski (lawyer from Chełmża, Doctor of Law, member of the city council, president of the local branch of the National Party).
- Catholic clergy: Roman Gdaniec (parish priest of the parish in Czarnowo), Stanisław Główczewski (parish priest of the parish in Kaszczorek), Antoni Januszewski (curate of the parish of St. Peter and Paul in Toruń), Czesław Lison (parish priest of the parish in Grabie), Jan Mencel (curate of the parish of St. Peter and Paul in Toruń), Jan Pronobis (parish priest of the parish in Grębocin), Ernest Wohlfeil (curate from Grzywna).
- Landowners: Leon Czarliński (landowner from Brąchnówek, social activist), Jan Donimirski (landowner from Łysomice, president of the Pomeranian Chamber of Agriculture), Dr. Kosiński (owner of an estate in Witków), Alfons Ornass (owner of the Kiełbasin estate).
- Merchants and entrepreneurs: Maksymilian Anusiak (butcher, merchant, chief of the volunteer fire department in Złotoria), Józef Ast (owner of a watchmaking and radio-electrotechnical workshop in Chełmża), Bolesław Barczyński (owner of a blacksmith's shop in Chełmża), Franciszek Ewert (owner of a locksmith's shop in Chełmża), Leon and Maria Gabryelewicz (owners of the Pod Strzechą restaurant in Toruń), Norbert Komowski (owner of a cosmetics store in Chełmża), Anastazy Krupecki (owner of the "Hats and Accessories" enterprise in Chełmża), Henryk Nowaczyk (owner of the Pod Bachusem restaurant and a vodka depot in Toruń, former Greater Poland uprising participant), Bronisław Olszewski (owner of a bakery in Toruń), Edward Radomski (merchant from Toruń), Władysława Seidler (owner of an optical shop in Toruń), Jan Skrzypnik (owner of a restaurant in Toruń), Jan Tarczykowski (owner of an upholstery and decorative workshop in Toruń), Leon Warszewski (merchant from Chełmża, owner of a tobacco wholesale), Franciszek Wiencek (master bookbinder from Toruń, social activist), Czesław Winiarski (merchant from Łubianka), Antoni Zuziak (merchant from Toruń).
- Polish Army soldiers: Captain Kaczmarski (residing in Toruń), Lance Corporal Franciszek Kawałkiewicz (residing in Toruń), Lance Corporal Rybarkiewicz (residing in Toruń), Franciszek Sakwiński (retired sergeant of the Polish Army), Józef Serafin (non-commissioned officer of the Polish Army, manager of the military power plant of the 31st Light Artillery Regiment in Toruń-Podgórz, gunsmith).
- Policemen: Jan Galiński (residing in Toruń), Jan Kowalski (residing in Toruń), Antoni Michalak (residing in Toruń), Józef Pietrzak (residing in Toruń).
- Others: Józef Czyżak (doctor from Toruń), Jan Kamiński (estate administrator in Przeczno), Bernard Klassen (paver, white-collar worker from Chełmża), Witold Kryszewski (Master of Science in agriculture engineering, former employee of the Bank of Poland branch in Toruń), Stanisław Płócienniczak (commander of Strzelec in Przeczno), Jan Rogalski (commander of Strzelec in Łubianka), Mieczysław Schmidt (manager of a dairy in Toruń), Jan Sobierajski (worker from Chełmża, member of the Polish Socialist Party), Władysław Szczygieł (president of the agricultural circle in Gostków), Leon Szymański (agricultural engineer, owner of a gardening company, member of the Catholic Action, co-founder of the Polish legion of Bayonne), Ludwik Wierzchowski (hairdresser, president of the branch of the War Veterans' Union in Toruń), Stanisław Więckowski (sugar factory worker and accountant from Chełmża).

In a separate list, Sziling and Grochowina included the names of 33 individuals who likely perished in Barbarka, but this fact cannot be definitively confirmed or ruled out. This list includes names such as: Henryk Jaskólski (teacher from Chełmża), Włodzimierz Kaczmarczyk (lawyer from Chełmża), Jan Kamiński (teacher from Toruń), Bożysław Kurowski (legal trainee from Chełmża), Schulwitz (school principal from Grzywna), Jerzy Stęplewski (doctor from Chełmża), Genowefa Szubert (teacher from Wrzosy), Gracjan Wróblewski (teacher from Chełmża), Leon Zacharek (teacher from Kuczwały).

Likely, at least some of the Jewish prisoners from Fort VII were also murdered in Barbarka. In this case, the victims were probably men, as some sources suggest that the Jewish female prisoners were most likely deported to Łódź.

== Epilogue ==
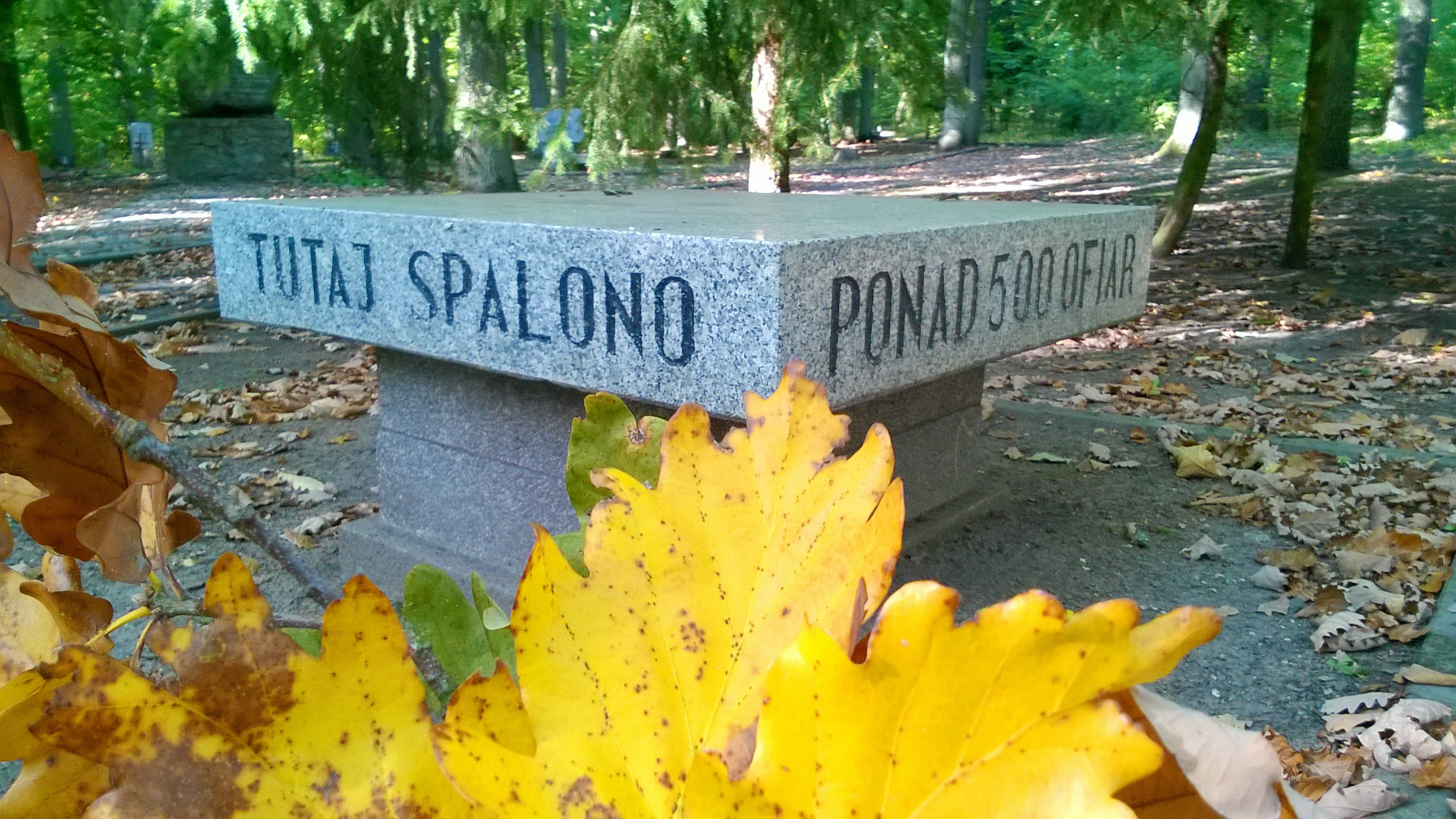
The memorial site marking the burning of the remains.

On 20 November 1939, Einsatzkommando 16 was disbanded, and its officers from the Toruń branch joined the newly established Gestapo office in Grudziądz. Then, on November 26, the German authorities officially dissolved the Pomeranian Selbstschutz. From that moment on, the mass executions in Barbarka basically ceased, giving way to deportations to concentration camps. Thanks to this, prisoners from the Chełmno and Wąbrzeźno counties, who were detained in Fort VII after the dissolution of the Selbstschutz, avoided being shot.

On 8 January 1940, around 100–200 prisoners were sent from Fort VII to the transit camp in the Gdańsk's New Port. Among those deported were several dozen Catholic clergymen. After spending several days in the New Port, almost all prisoners from the Toruń transport were transferred to the Stutthof concentration camp. By the end of January, the Toruń Internierungslager was moved from Fort VII to the nearby Fort VIII, where it operated until its final liquidation in July 1940. (Note: During this time, several transports left the fort for concentration camps. On 21 March 1940, several inmates were deported to Stutthof concentration camp. Shortly thereafter, several hundred prisoners were transported to Sachsenhausen concentration camp. (Stutthof: hitlerowski obóz koncentracyjny (1988, pp. 56, 73), W czasach Polski Odrodzonej i okupacji niemieckiej (1920–1945) (2006, p. 560)))

In the second half of 1944, as the Red Army approached, the Germans attempted to erase all traces of the crimes. In Barbarka, a network of guard posts was established, and signs with inscriptions in German and Polish were set up, prohibiting local residents from entering the forest under the threat of death. Almost all mass graves were opened, and the bodies buried in them were exhumed and burned.

== Aftermath ==
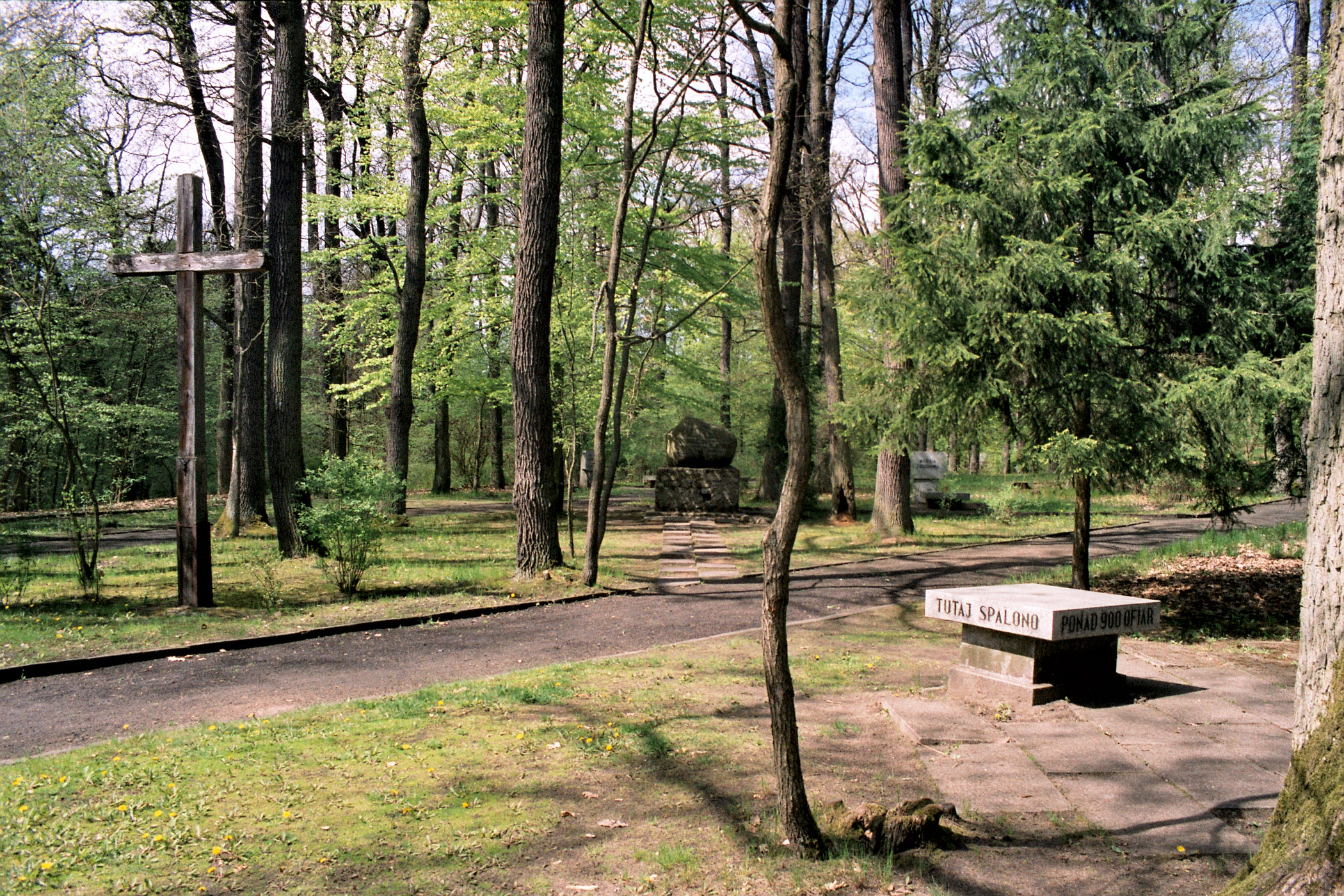
The memorial site in 2005.

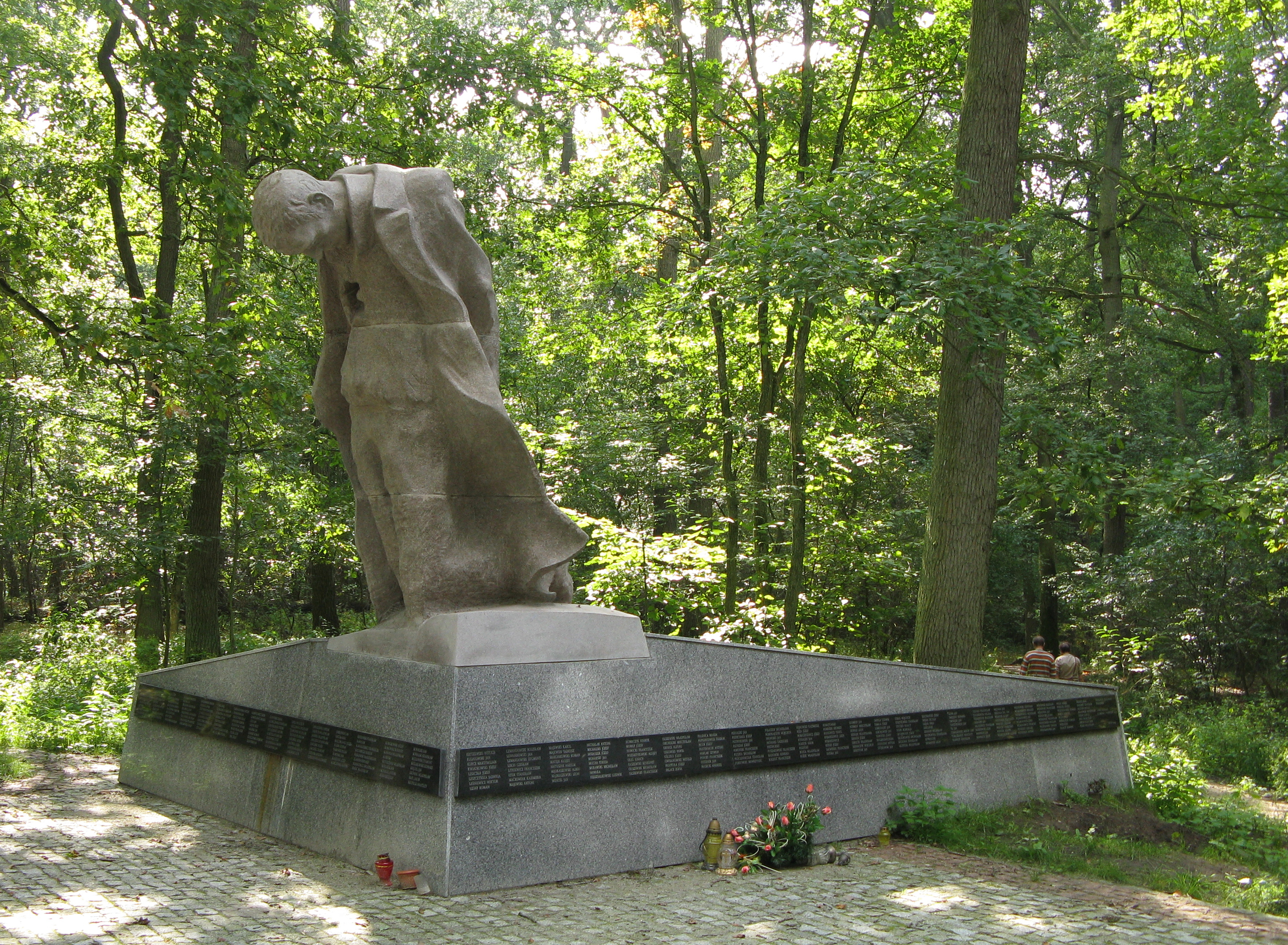
The monument in honor of the murdered, unveiled in Barbarka in October 2009.

Soon after the end of the war, forensic exhumation work was carried out in the Barbarka forest. During the examination conducted on 24 September 1945, traces of a bonfire and six mass graves were found, with lengths and widths as follows: 47 meters by 3 meters, 11 meters by 2 meters, 10 meters by 2 meters, 6 meters by 2 meters, 5 meters by 4 meters, and 3.5 meters by 2 meters. (Note: In some sources, you can find information that seven mass graves were found in Barbarka ( for example, Niemy świadek. Zbrodnie hitlerowskie w toruńskim Forcie VII i w lesie Barbarka (1971, p. 45), and Eksterminacja inteligencji polskiej na Pomorzu Gdańskim (wrzesień–grudzień 1939) (1972, p. 75)). This may be due to the fact that in the protocols of the inspections and exhumations conducted in 1945–1946, the dimensions of the grave where the victims of German terror were found are sometimes described as 11 × 2 meters and other times as approximately 15 × 3 meters. (Barbarka. Miejsce niemieckich egzekucji Polaków z Torunia i okolic (październik–grudzień 1939) (2009, pp. 83–85))) Only the second of the mentioned graves was filled with bodies; the Germans had emptied the rest during their actions to cover up the evidence of the crime. The exhumation of the preserved grave was carried out on 19 October 1946. At that time, 87 bodies were recovered, of which thirteen were identified. All the recovered remains were buried in the municipal cemetery on Grudziądzka Street in Toruń.

Initially, modest obelisks commemorated the execution site in the Barbarka forest. A memorial plaque was also placed on the so-called "death wall" at Fort VII. On 28 October 2009, a new monument to honor the victims was unveiled in Barbarka, designed by Marian Molenda. At the same time, the area around the monument was developed. Currently, the monument-cemetery complex in Barbarka includes:

- a three-meter-high granite sculpture designed by Marian Molenda, depicting a person falling into the grave. The names of the identified victims of the crime are inscribed on its pedestal;
- mass graves and a bonfire site marked with plaques;
- a stone block with a plaque honoring the victims of Fort VII;
- a boulder with an inscription commemorating the teachers murdered in Barbarka.

== Liability of perpetrators ==
Criminal responsibility for crimes committed, among others, in Barbarka, was borne by Albert Forster, the Gauleiter of the Nazi Party and Reichsstatthalter in the Reichsgau Danzig-West Prussia division, who was sentenced to death by the Supreme National Tribunal in April 1948. The sentence was carried out on 28 February 1952, in the Mokotów Prison in Warsaw. SS-Gruppenführer Richard Hildebrandt, the Higher SS and Police Leader in the Reichsgau Danzig-West Prussia division from 1939 to 1943, was sentenced to death by a Polish court in Bydgoszcz. The sentence was carried out on 10 March 1951.

None of the SS officers and members of the Selbstschutz directly responsible for the repression against the Toruń intelligentsia and the mass murders in Barbarka were brought to criminal responsibility. The leader of the Pomeranian Selbstschutz, Ludolf-Hermann von Alvensleben, fled to Argentina after the war, where he died in April 1970. Criminal Commissioner Hans-Joachim Leyer, the head of the Toruń branch of EK 16, appeared only as a witness in the prosecutor's investigation.

From June 4 to June 27, 1969, a trial of Karl Friedrich Strauss, the commandant of the internment camp at Fort VII in Toruń, took place in West Berlin. Despite evidence during the trial that the accused personally participated in the executions in Barbarka, the jury acquitted Strauss, ruling that he was only following orders from his superiors.

== Bibliography ==
- Biskup, Marian, ed. (2006). "W czasach Polski Odrodzonej i okupacji niemieckiej (1920–1945)". Historia Torunia. 2. Vol. III. Toruń: Wydawnictwo Towarzystwa Naukowego. ISBN 83-87639-79-6.
- Böhler, Jochen; Klaus-Michael, Jürgen; Mallmann, Matthäus (2009). Einsatzgruppen w Polsce. Warsaw: Bellona. ISBN 978-83-11-11588-0.
- Bojarska, Barbara (1972). Eksterminacja inteligencji polskiej na Pomorzu Gdańskim (wrzesień–grudzień 1939). Poznań: Instytut Zachodni.
- Ciechanowski, Konrad (1988). Stutthof: hitlerowski obóz koncentracyjny. Warsaw: Interpress. ISBN 83-223-2369-7.
- Drwęcki, Zygmunt (1969). Miejsca walk i męczeństwa w województwie bydgoskim 1939–1945. Bydgoszcz: Wojewódzki Komitet Obywatelski Ochrony Pomników Walki i Meczeństwa, Kujawsko-Pomorskie Towarzystwo Kulturalne.
- Grochowina, Sylwia; Sziling, Jan (2009). Barbarka. Miejsce niemieckich egzekucji Polaków z Torunia i okolic (październik–grudzień 1939). Toruń: Fundacja Archiwum i Muzeum Pomorskie Armii Krajowej oraz Wojskowej Służby Polek. ISBN 978-83-88693-22-9.
- Jastrzębski, Włodzimierz; Sziling, Jan (1979). Okupacja hitlerowska na Pomorzu Gdańskim w latach 1939–1945. Gdańsk: Wydawnictwo Morskie. ISBN 83-215-71840.
- Jastrzębski, Włodzimierz (1974). Terror i zbrodnia. Eksterminacja ludności polskiej i żydowskiej w rejencji bydgoskiej w latach 1939–1945. Warsaw: Interpress.
- Jaszowski, Tadeusz; Sobecki, Czesław (1971). Niemy świadek. Zbrodnie hitlerowskie w toruńskim Forcie VII i w lesie Barbarka. Bydgoszcz: Okręgowa Komisja Badania Zbrodni Hitlerowskich i Kujawsko-Pomorskie Towarzystwo Kulturalne.
- Kur, Tadeusz (1975). Trzy srebrne róże znaczą szlak zbrodni. Saga rodu von Alvenslebenów. Warsaw: Wydawnictwo MON.
- Schenk, Dieter (2002). Albert Forster. Gdański namiestnik Hitlera. Gdańsk: Wydawnictwo Oskar. ISBN 83-86181-83-4.
- Wardzyńska, Maria (2009). Był rok 1939. Operacja niemieckiej policji bezpieczeństwa w Polsce. Intelligenzaktion. Warsaw: Instytut Pamięci Narodowej. ISBN 978-83-7629-063-8.
- Rejestr miejsc i faktów zbrodni popełnionych przez okupanta hitlerowskiego na ziemiach polskich w latach 1939–1945. Województwo toruńskie. Warsaw: GKBZH. 1983.
