= Franz Jakob =

Franz Jakob may refer to:

- Franz Jakob (politician) (1891–1965), German Nazi politician
- Franz G. Jacob (1870–?), German chess player
- Franz Jakob (bobsleigh) (1949–), Austrian bobsledder
