= Słomowo =

Słomowo may refer to the following places:

- Słomowo, Oborniki County in Greater Poland Voivodeship (west-central Poland)
- Słomowo, Września County in Greater Poland Voivodeship (west-central Poland)
- Słomowo, Kuyavian-Pomeranian Voivodeship (north-central Poland)
- Słomowo, Warmian-Masurian Voivodeship (north Poland)
