= Bierzgłowo =

- Village
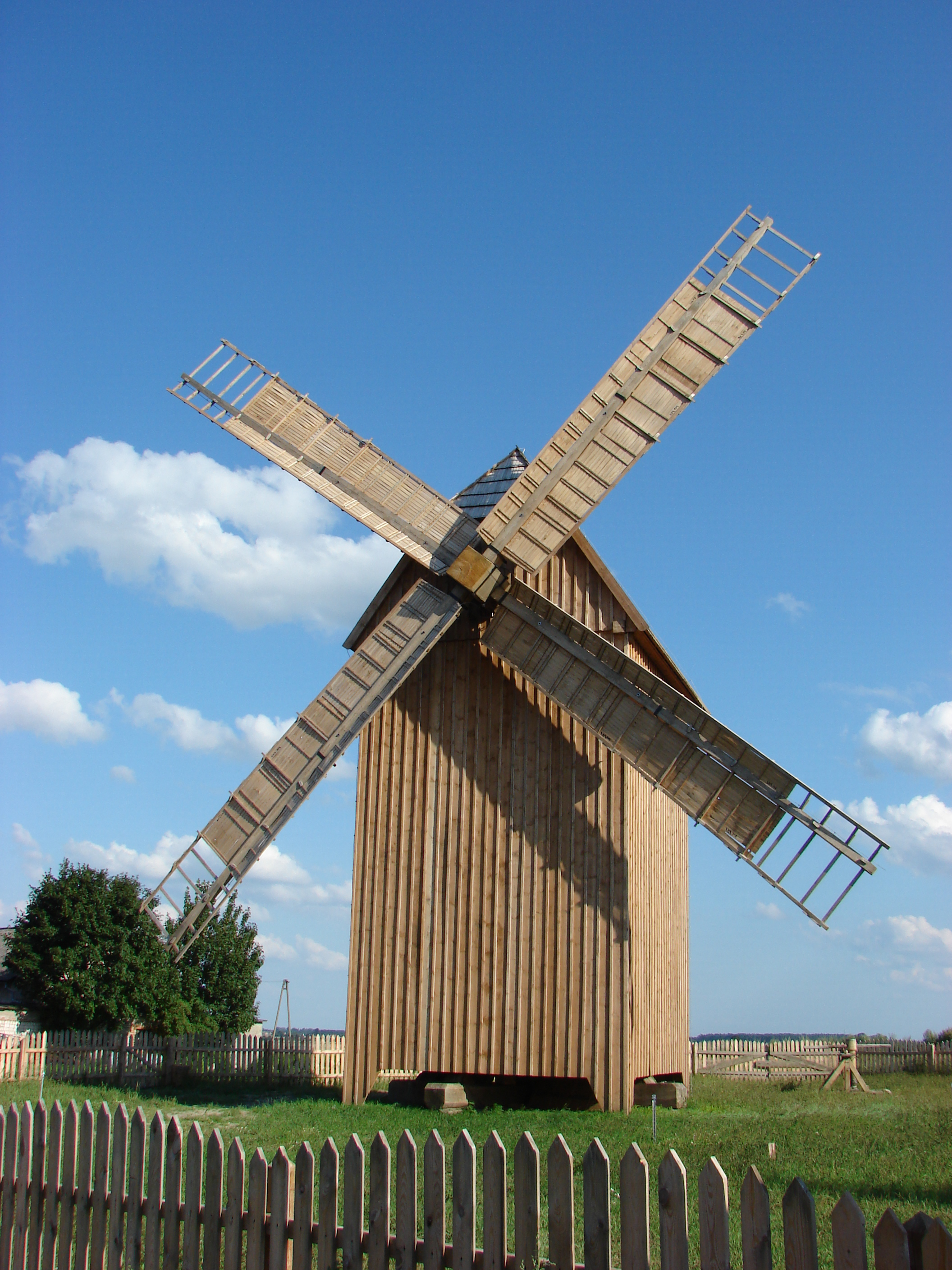

- Location within Poland
- Coordinates: 53°8′N 18°27′E
- Country: Poland
- Voivodeship: Kuyavian-Pomeranian
- County: Toruń
- Gmina: Łubianka
- Population: 200

Bierzgłowo [bjɛʐˈɡwɔvɔ] is a village in the administrative district of Gmina Łubianka, within Toruń County, Kuyavian-Pomeranian Voivodeship, in north-central Poland.

Birgelau was the seat of a Komtur of the Teutonic Knights. A castle was erected in 1232 and expanded until 1305 - now in the neighbouring village Zamek Bierzgłowski.

In the village there is a Gothic church from 13th/14th century and one of the few still existing post mills in the region, restored in 2011.
