= Gmina Łubianka =

Gmina Łubianka Łubianka Commune
- Gmina
- Coat of arms

- Location within Poland
- Coordinates (Łubianka): 53°8′N 18°30′E
- Country: Poland
- Voivodeship: Kuyavian-Pomeranian
- County: Toruń County
- Seat: Łubianka

Area
  - Total: 84.64 km^{2} (32.68 sq mi)

Population (2006)
  - Total: 5,734
  - Density: 67.75/km^{2} (175.5/sq mi)
- Website: https://www.lubianka.pl/

Gmina Łubianka is a rural gmina (administrative district) in Toruń County, Kuyavian-Pomeranian Voivodeship, in north-central Poland. Its seat is the village of Łubianka, which lies approximately 14 kilometres (9 mi) north-west of Toruń.

The gmina covers an area of 84.64 square kilometres (32.7 sq mi), and as of 2006 its total population is 5,734.

== Villages ==
Gmina Łubianka contains the villages and settlements of Bierzgłowo, Biskupice, Brąchnowo, Dębiny, Leszcz, Łubianka, Pigża, Przeczno, Słomowo, Warszewice, Wybcz, Wybczyk, Wymysłowo and Zamek Bierzgłowski.

== Neighbouring gminas ==
Gmina Łubianka is bordered by the gminas of Chełmża, Kijewo Królewskie, Łysomice, Unisław and Zławieś Wielka.
