= Wybczyk =

- Village
- Location within Poland
- Coordinates: 53°10′14″N 18°25′37″E
- Country: Poland
- Voivodeship: Kuyavian-Pomeranian
- County: Toruń
- Gmina: Łubianka

Wybczyk [ˈvɨpt͡ʂɨk] is a village in the administrative district of Gmina Łubianka, within Toruń County, Kuyavian-Pomeranian Voivodeship, in north-central Poland.
