= Warszewice, Kuyavian-Pomeranian Voivodeship =

Warszewice
- Village
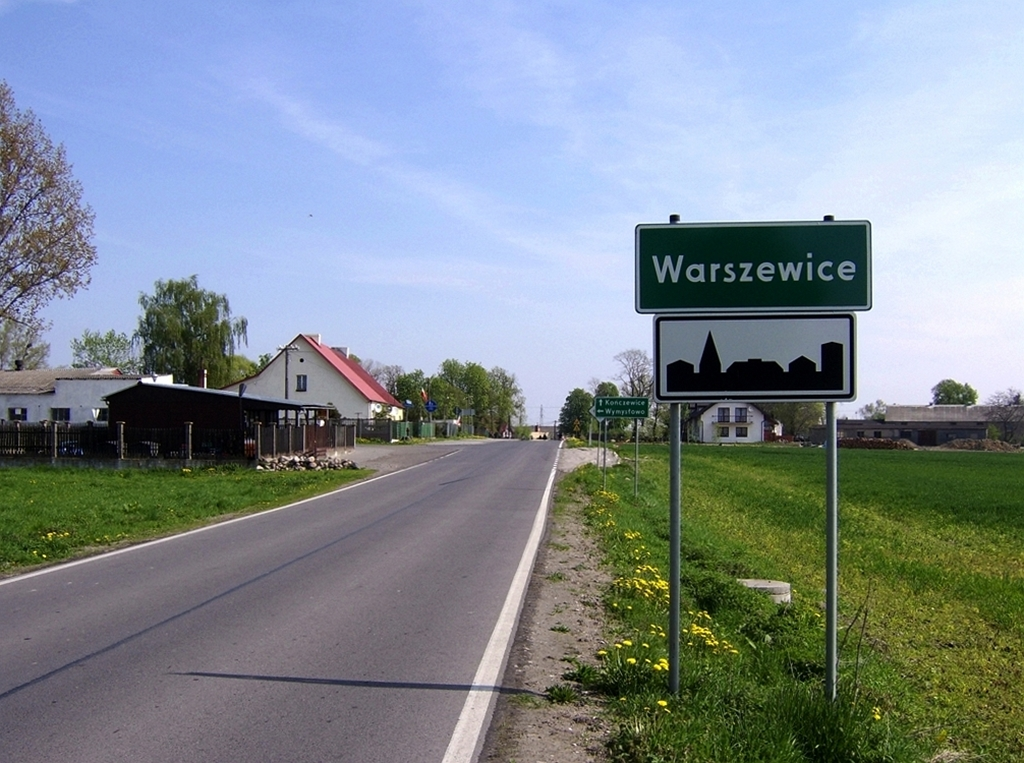
- Entrance to the village

- Location within Poland
- Coordinates: 53°10′17″N 18°32′4″E
- Country: Poland
- Voivodeship: Kuyavian-Pomeranian
- County: Toruń
- Gmina: Łubianka
- First mentioned: 1222
- Population: 616
- Time zone: UTC+1 (CET)
  - Summer (DST): UTC+2 (CEST)
- Vehicle registration: CTR

Warszewice [varʂɛˈvit͡sɛ] is a village in the administrative district of Gmina Łubianka, within Toruń County, Kuyavian-Pomeranian Voivodeship, in north-central Poland. It is located in Chełmno Land within the historic region of Pomerania.

== History ==
The oldest known mention in documents comes from 1222.

During the German occupation of Poland (World War II), Warszewice was one of the sites of executions of Poles, carried out by the Germans in 1939 as part of the Intelligenzaktion.
