= Leszcz, Toruń County =

Leszcz
- Village
- Location within Poland
- Coordinates: 53°6′16″N 18°30′9″E
- Country: Poland
- Voivodeship: Kuyavian-Pomeranian
- County: Toruń
- Gmina: Łubianka
- Population: 110

Leszcz [lɛʂt͡ʂ] is a village in the administrative district of Gmina Łubianka, within Toruń County, Kuyavian-Pomeranian Voivodeship, in north-central Poland.
