= Dębiny, Toruń County =

Dębiny
- Village
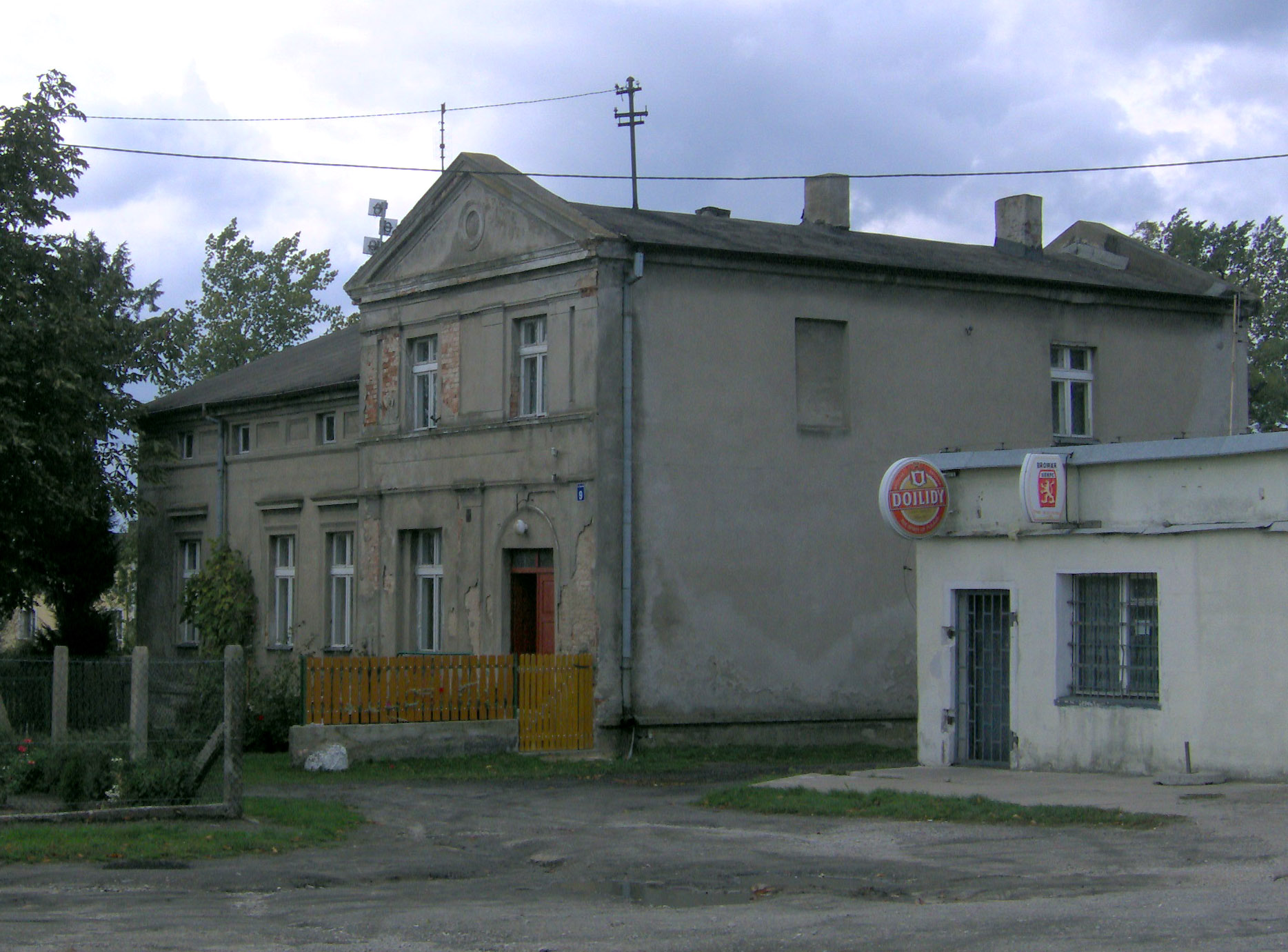
- Manor house in Dębiny

- Location within Poland
- Coordinates: 53°10′17″N 18°29′21″E
- Country: Poland
- Voivodeship: Kuyavian-Pomeranian
- County: Toruń
- Gmina: Łubianka
- Population: 275

Dębiny [dɛmˈbinɨ] is a village in the administrative district of Gmina Łubianka, within Toruń County, Kuyavian-Pomeranian Voivodeship, in north-central Poland.

In 2005 the village had a population of 275.
