= Biskupice, Toruń County =

Biskupice
- Village
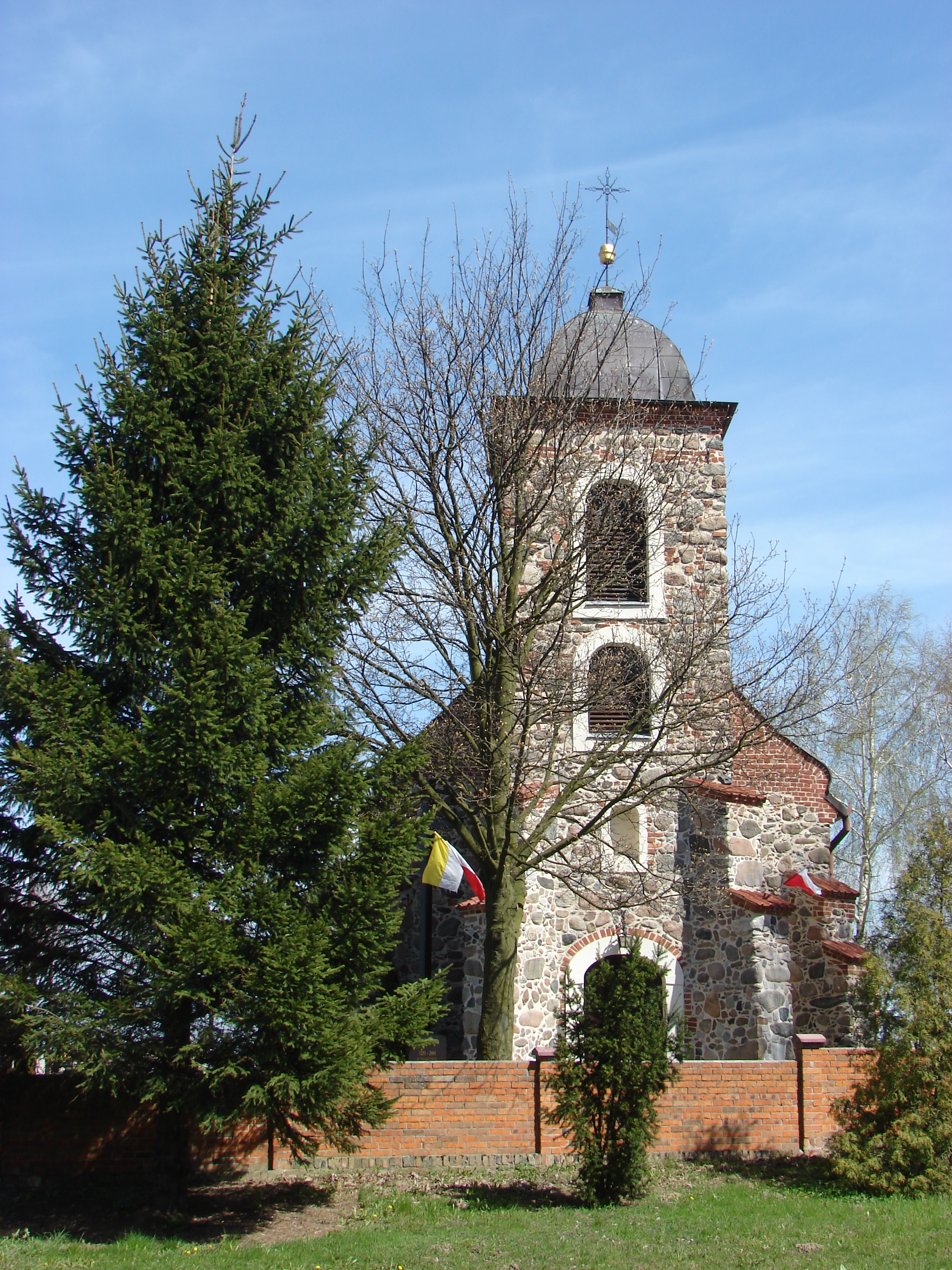
- Parish church of Saint Mary Magdalene, built 1760-1764.

- Location within Poland
- Coordinates: 53°9′N 18°31′E
- Country: Poland
- Voivodeship: Kuyavian-Pomeranian
- County: Toruń
- Gmina: Łubianka
- Population: 465

Biskupice [biskuˈpit͡sɛ] is a village in the administrative district of Gmina Łubianka, within Toruń County, Kuyavian-Pomeranian Voivodeship, in north-central Poland.
