= Zamek Bierzgłowski =

- Village
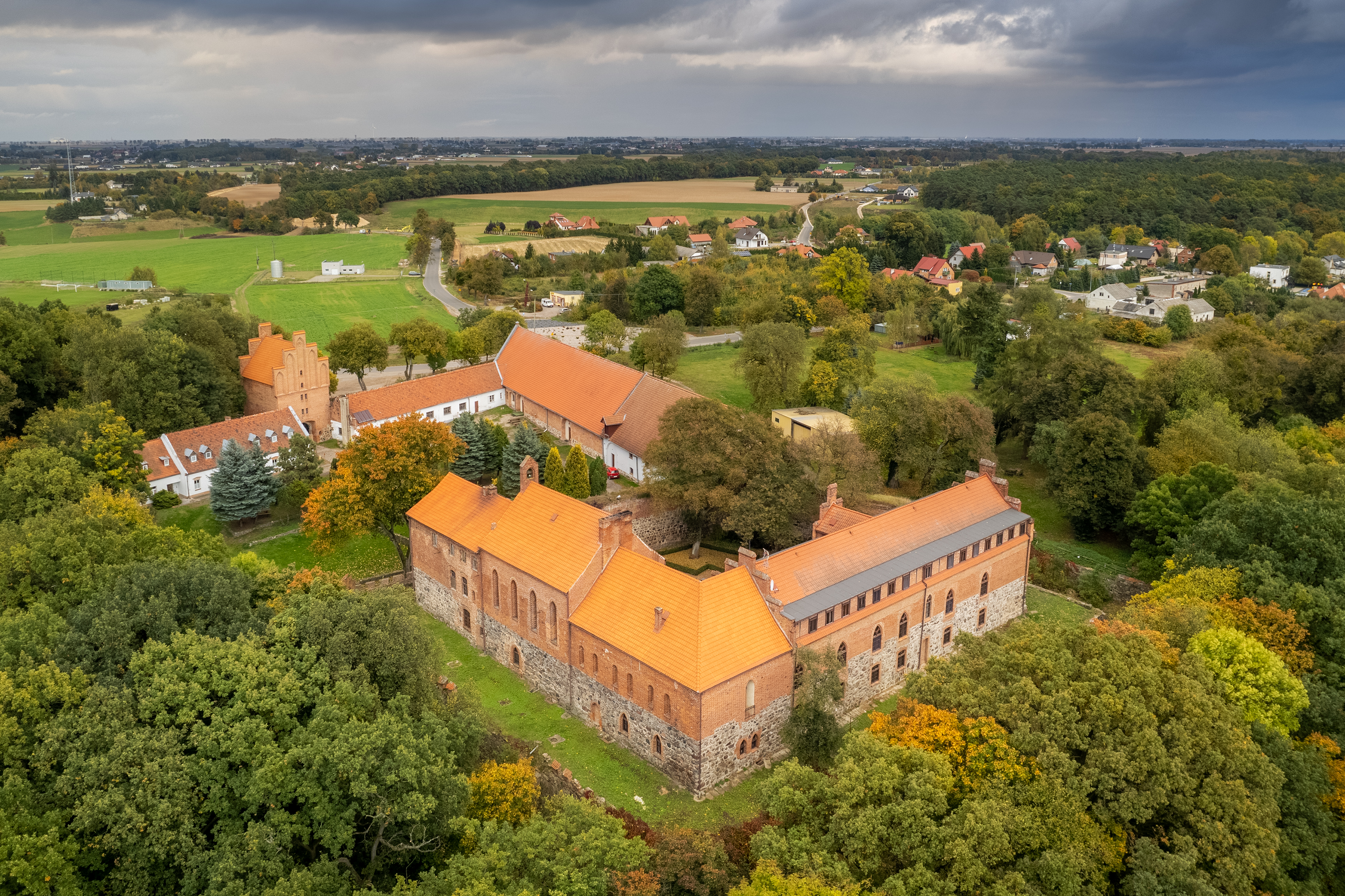
- Aerial view of the castle and village

- Location within Poland
- Coordinates: 53°6′N 18°28′E
- Country: Poland
- Voivodeship: Kuyavian-Pomeranian
- County: Toruń
- Gmina: Łubianka

Population
  - Total: 490
- Time zone: UTC+1 (CET)
  - Summer (DST): UTC+2 (CEST)
- Vehicle registration: CTR

Zamek Bierzgłowski [ˈzamɛk bjɛʐˈɡwɔfski] is a village in the administrative district of Gmina Łubianka, within Toruń County, Kuyavian-Pomeranian Voivodeship, in north-central Poland. It is located in historic Chełmno Land.

The local landmark is the medieval Zamek Bierzgłowski Castle.
