= Bydgoszcz District =

Former dministrative districts of Poznań

Coordinates: 53°07′00″N 18°00′00″E

Bydgoszcz District (Polish: Rejencja Bydgoska, German Regierungsbezirk Bromberg) was the more northern of two administrative districts of the Grand Duchy of Poznań (1815-1918) (later also called the Province of Poznań (1849-1918)).

It underwent several changes during World War II.

== Administrative division (in 1897) ==
- Bydgoszcz District (Rejencja Bydgoska), Bydgoszcz

(English county name, Polish county name, county town)
(please note that at this time Polish county names were written with capital letters)

- Bydgoszcz City, (Miasto Bydgoszcz), Bydgoszcz
- Bydgoszcz County, (Powiat Bydgoski), Bydgoszcz
- Chodzież County, (Powiat Chodzieski), Chodzież
- Gniezno County, (Powiat Gnieźnieński), Gniezno
- Inowrocław County, (Powiat Inowrocławski), Inowrocław
- Mogilno County, (Powiat Mogileński), Mogilno
- Strzelno County, (Powiat Strzelneński), Strzelno
- Szubin County, (Powiat Szubiński), Szubin
- Wągrowiec County, (Powiat Wągrowiecki), Wągrowiec
- Witkowo County, (Powiat Witkowski), Witkowo
- Wyrzysk County, (Powiat Wyrzyski), Wyrzysk
- Żnin County, (Powiat Żniński), Żnin

== The Greater Poland and Kuyavia divisions ==
- Greater Poland (geopolitical division of Poland)
- Dukes of Greater Poland (12th-13th centuries)
- Poznań Voivodship (14th century-1793)
- Kalisz Voivodship (14th century-1793)
- Inowrocław Voivodship (14th century-1793)
- South Prussia (1793-1806)
- Duchy of Warsaw (1806-1815)
- Grand Duchy of Poznań (1815-1918)
- Poznań Voivodship (1918-1939)
- Pomeranian Voivodship (1939-1993)
- Reichsgau Wartheland (1939-1945)
- Pomeranian Voivodship (1945-1950)
- Bydgoszcz Voivodship (1950-1998)
- Kuyavian-Pomeranian Voivodship (since 1999)
- Bydgoszcz (city)

== See also ==
- Poznań District
