= Gostkowo, Kuyavian-Pomeranian Voivodeship =

Gostkowo
- Village
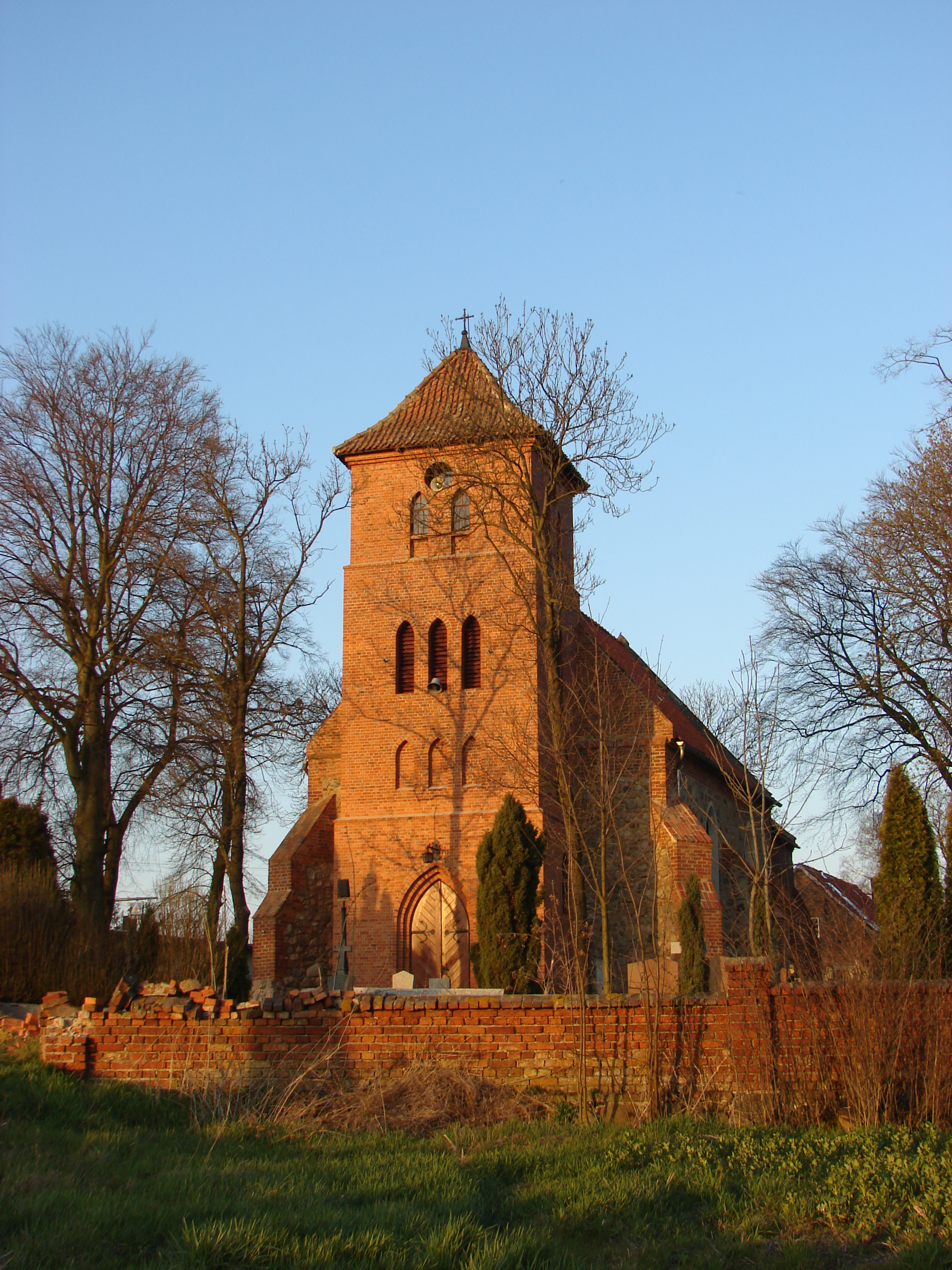
- Parish church of Virgin Mary, built turn of the 13th-14th century.

- Location within Poland
- Coordinates: 53°7′N 18°42′E
- Country: Poland
- Voivodeship: Kuyavian-Pomeranian
- County: Toruń
- Gmina: Łysomice

Gostkowo [ɡɔstˈkɔvɔ] is a village in the administrative district of Gmina Łysomice, within Toruń County, Kuyavian-Pomeranian Voivodeship, in north-central Poland.
