= Łubianka, Kuyavian-Pomeranian Voivodeship =

Łubianka
- Village
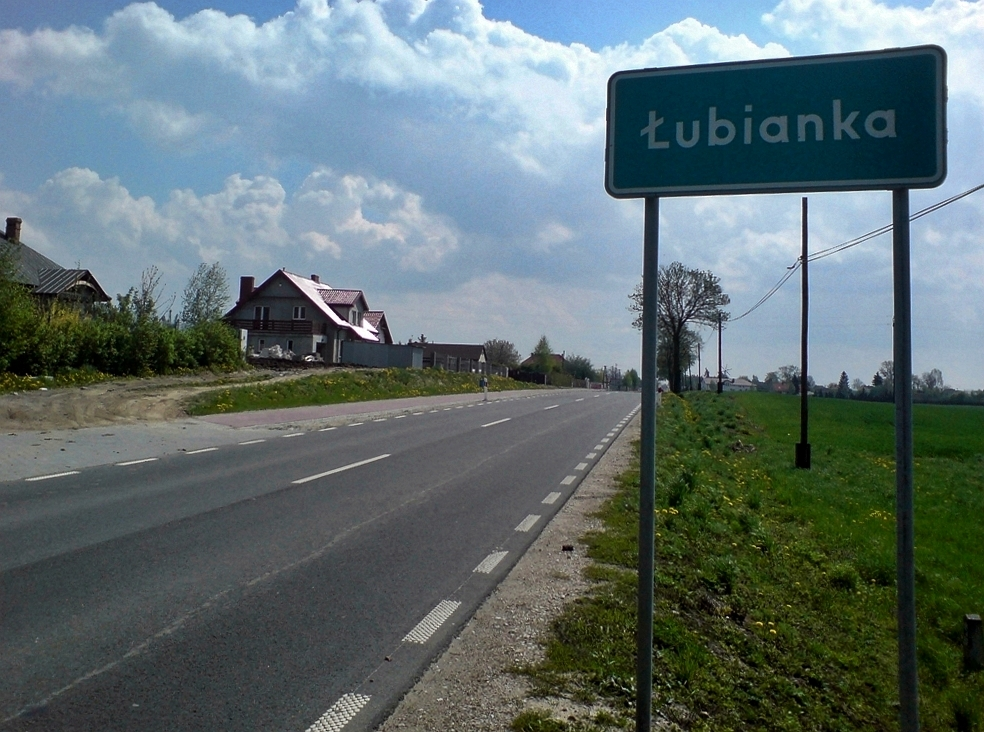

- Location within Poland
- Coordinates: 53°8′N 18°30′E
- Country: Poland
- Voivodeship: Kuyavian-Pomeranian
- County: Toruń
- Gmina: Łubianka
- Population: 953
- Website: http://www.lubianka.pl

Łubianka [wuˈbjanka] is a village in Toruń County, Kuyavian-Pomeranian Voivodeship, in north-central Poland. It is the seat of the gmina (administrative district) called Gmina Łubianka.
