= Brąchnowo =

- Village
- Location within Poland
- Coordinates: 53°9′N 18°33′E
- Country: Poland
- Voivodeship: Kuyavian-Pomeranian
- County: Toruń
- Gmina: Łubianka
- Population: 501

Brąchnowo [brɔ̃xˈnɔvɔ] is a village in the administrative district of Gmina Łubianka, within Toruń County, Kuyavian-Pomeranian Voivodeship, in north-central Poland.
