= Barbarka, Toruń =

District of Toruń, Poland

Barbarka
- District of Toruń
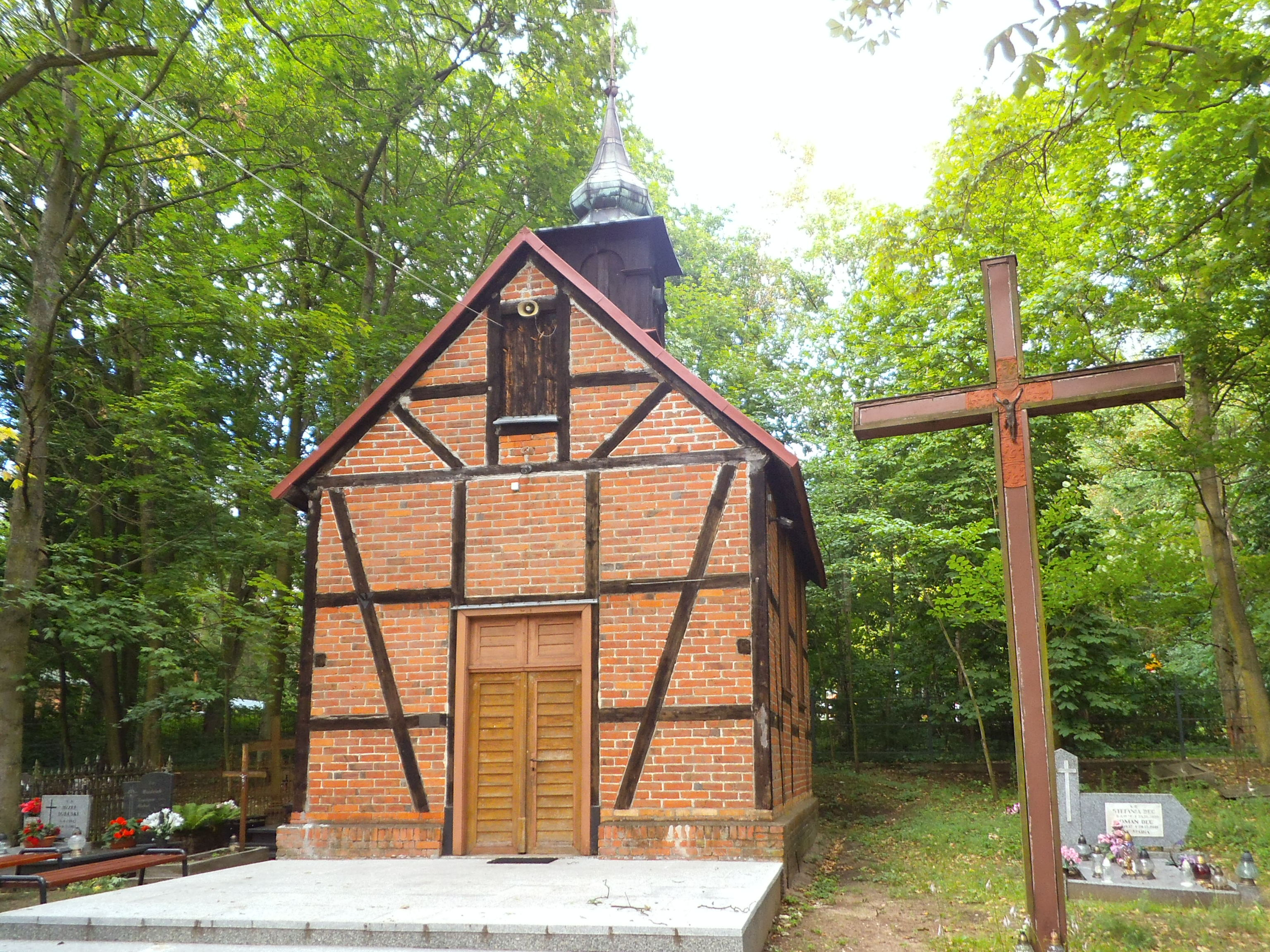
- Saint Barbara chapel

- Location of Barbarka within Toruń
- Coordinates: 53°3′N 18°33′E
- Country: Poland
- Voivodeship: Kuyavian-Pomeranian
- County/City: Toruń
- Time zone: UTC+1 (CET)
  - Summer (DST): UTC+2 (CEST)
- Vehicle registration: CT

Barbarka [barˈbarka] is a district of Toruń, Poland, located in the north-western part of the city.

== History ==
During the German occupation of Poland in time of World War II, Barbarka was the site of German massacres of over 1,100 Poles from Toruń, Chełmża, Skępe and other places in the region, including teachers, school principals, local officials, restaurateurs, shop owners, merchants, farmers, railwaymen, policemen, craftsmen, students, priests, workers, doctors, committed as part of the Intelligenzaktion. Six mass graves were discovered after the war, in five of which the bodies of the victims were burnt, as the Germans tried to cover up the crime.
