= Słomowo, Kuyavian-Pomeranian Voivodeship =

Słomowo
- Village
- Location within Poland
- Coordinates: 53°9′5″N 18°26′17″E
- Country: Poland
- Voivodeship: Kuyavian-Pomeranian
- County: Toruń
- Gmina: Łubianka
- Population: 60

Słomowo [swɔˈmɔvɔ] is a village in the administrative district of Gmina Łubianka, within Toruń County, Kuyavian-Pomeranian Voivodeship, in north-central Poland.
