= Wymysłowo, Toruń County =

Wymysłowo
- Village
- Location within Poland
- Coordinates: 53°09′46″N 18°30′12″E
- Country: Poland
- Voivodeship: Kuyavian-Pomeranian
- County: Toruń
- Gmina: Łubianka

Wymysłowo [vɨmɨˈswɔvɔ] is a village in the administrative district of Gmina Łubianka, within Toruń County, Kuyavian-Pomeranian Voivodeship, in north-central Poland.
