= Przeczno, Kuyavian-Pomeranian Voivodeship =

Przeczno
- Village
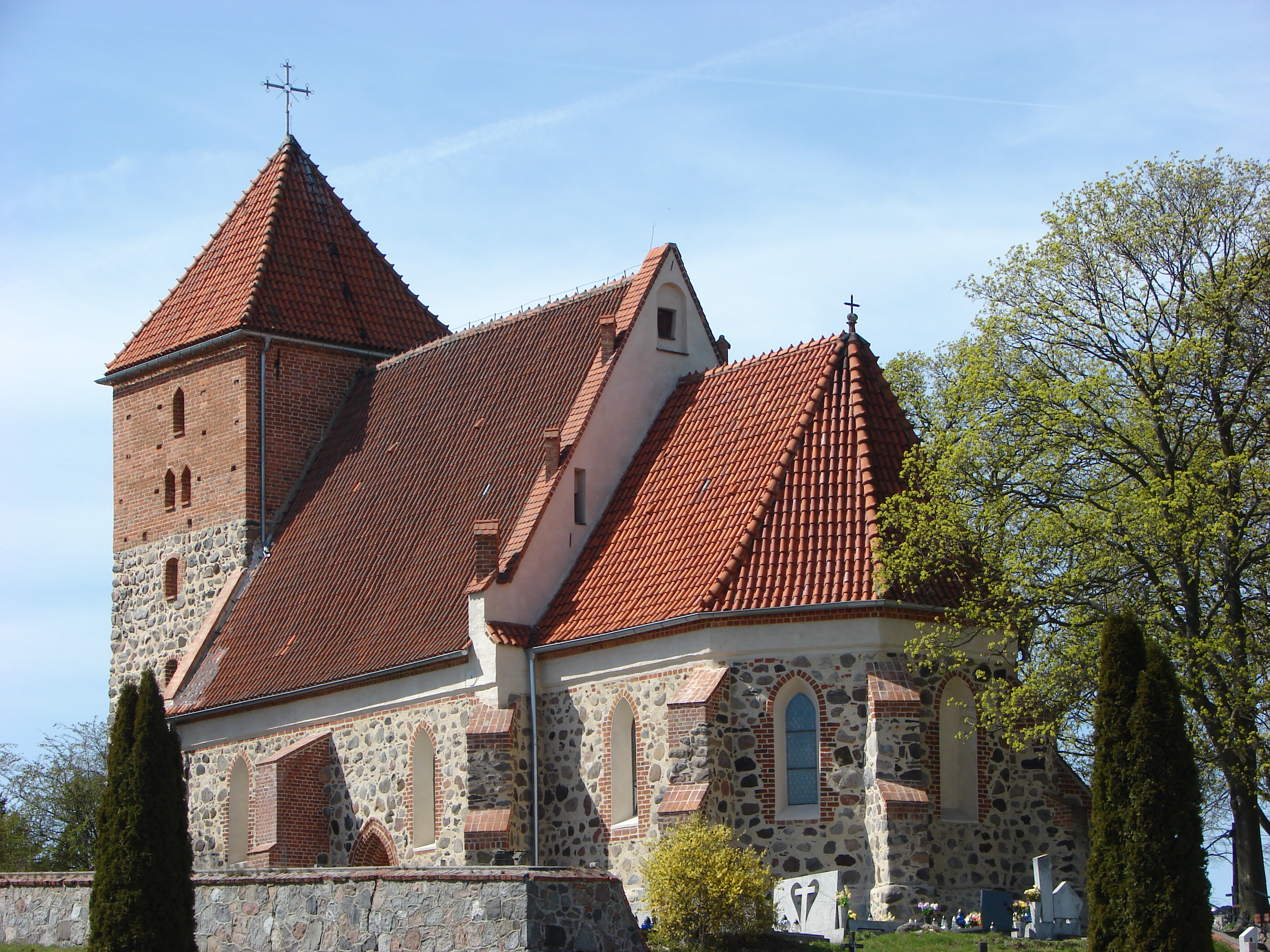
- Parish church of The Holy Cross, built about 1300.

- Location within Poland
- Coordinates: 53°9′2″N 18°28′37″E
- Country: Poland
- Voivodeship: Kuyavian-Pomeranian
- County: Toruń
- Gmina: Łubianka
- Population: 267

Przeczno [ˈpʂɛt͡ʂnɔ] is a village in the administrative district of Gmina Łubianka, within Toruń County, Kuyavian-Pomeranian Voivodeship, in north-central Poland.
