= Franz Jakob (politician) =

Franz Jakob (November 17, 1891 in Veitsaurach – 10 September 1965 in Ingolstadt) was a German Nazi politician.

== Background ==
Jakob worked as a railroad chief secretary. In 1930 he moved as a member of the Nazi Party in the City Council of Fürth. He was also member of the Bavarian Landtag and from 1933 to 1940 he was mayor of the city of Fürth.
