= Zławieś Wielka =

- Community
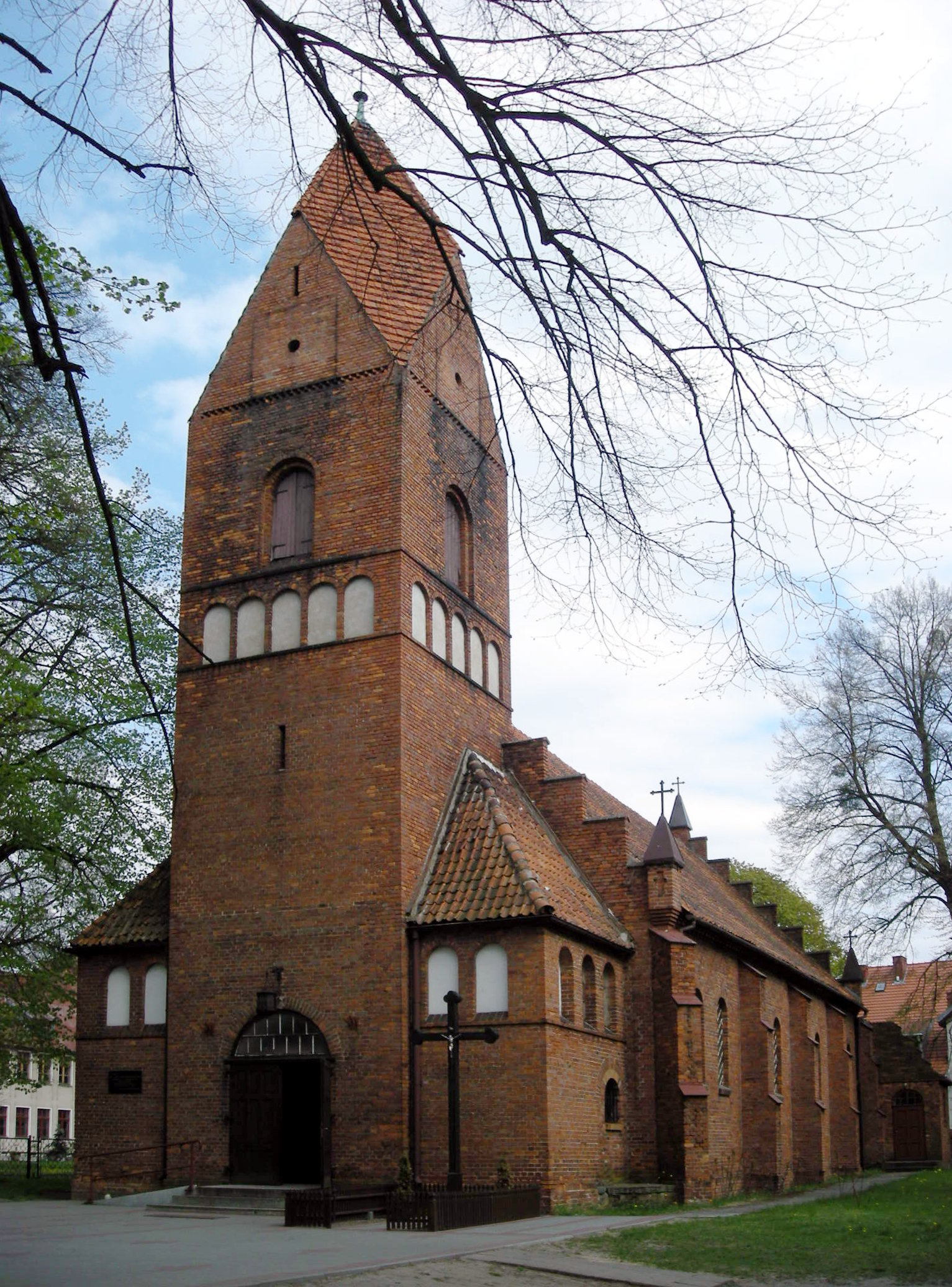
- A local Catholic church (formerly Lutheran)

- Location within Poland
- Coordinates: 53°05′49″N 18°19′36″E
- Country: Poland
- Voivodeship: Kuyavian-Pomeranian
- County: Toruń
- Gmina: Zławieś Wielka
- Population: 894

Zławieś Wielka [ˈzwavjɛɕ ˈvjɛlka] is a community in Toruń County, Kuyavian-Pomeranian Voivodeship, in north-central Poland. It is the seat of the gmina (administrative district) called Gmina Zławieś Wielka. The community consists of the villages: Cegielnik, Cichoradz, Czarne Błoto, Czarnowo, Górsk, Gutowo, Łążyn, Pędzewo, Przysiek, Rozgarty, Rzęczkowo, Siemoń, Skłudzewo, Stary Toruń, Toporzysko, Zarośle Cienkie, Zławieś Mała, and Zławieś Wielka.

== Projects ==
Zławieś Wielka has 3 projects: Co-financing for residents, Co-financing of the commune, and building roads.

=== Co-financing for residents ===
- Applications for construction of household sewage plans (Ends:July 6)
- Applications for replacement of heat sources powered by solid fuels under Stop for smog 2020

=== Co-financing of the commune ===
- Establishment of commune center

Objectives:

- Increase social activity
- Reduce the level of poverty and social exclusion
- Economic recovery

Contractor: Przedsiębiorstwo Usługowe ARBUD Justyna Popielewska based in Młyniec Drugi, ul. Żwirowa 17, 87-162 Lubicz Górny. Date agreement made:October 14, 2020

- Recreation Area(Playground)

Goals:

- Create areas for tourists
- improve the quality of life

Includes:

- A play set
- A swing
- A springboard
- weight swings
- A carousel
- A sandbox
