= Witowąż =

- Village
- Location within Poland
- Coordinates: 52°55′N 18°56′E
- Country: Poland
- Voivodeship: Kuyavian-Pomeranian
- County: Toruń
- Gmina: Czernikowo

Witowąż [viˈtɔvɔ̃ʂ] is a village in the administrative district of Gmina Czernikowo, within Toruń County, Kuyavian-Pomeranian Voivodeship, in north-central Poland.
