= Makowiska, Toruń County =

Makowiska
- Village
- Location within Poland
- Coordinates: 52°54′22″N 19°02′00″E
- Country: Poland
- Voivodeship: Kuyavian-Pomeranian
- County: Toruń
- Gmina: Czernikowo

Makowiska [makɔˈviska] is a village in the administrative district of Gmina Czernikowo, within Toruń County, Kuyavian-Pomeranian Voivodeship, in north-central Poland.
