= Doły Łążyńskie =

- Village
- Location within Poland
- Coordinates: 53°6′11″N 18°24′35″E
- Country: Poland
- Voivodeship: Kuyavian-Pomeranian
- County: Toruń
- Gmina: Zławieś Wielka

Doły Łążyńskie [ˈdɔwɨ wɔ̃ˈʐɨɲskʲɛ] is a village in the administrative district of Gmina Zławieś Wielka, within Toruń County, Kuyavian-Pomeranian Voivodeship, in north-central Poland.
