= Szerokie, Kuyavian-Pomeranian Voivodeship =

Szerokie
- Village
- Location within Poland
- Coordinates: 53°4′35″N 18°25′24″E
- Country: Poland
- Voivodeship: Kuyavian-Pomeranian
- County: Toruń
- Gmina: Zławieś Wielka

Szerokie [ʂɛˈrɔkʲɛ] is a village in the administrative district of Gmina Zławieś Wielka, within Toruń County, Kuyavian-Pomeranian Voivodeship, in north-central Poland.
