= Kamieniec, Toruń County =

Kamieniec
- Village
- Location within Poland
- Coordinates: 53°6′37″N 18°13′25″E
- Country: Poland
- Voivodeship: Kuyavian-Pomeranian
- County: Toruń
- Gmina: Zławieś Wielka

Kamieniec [kaˈmjɛɲɛt͡s] is a village in the administrative district of Gmina Zławieś Wielka, within Toruń County, Kuyavian-Pomeranian Voivodeship, in north-central Poland.
