= Father Jerzy Popiełuszko Museum in Warsaw =

Museum in Warsaw, Poland

Coordinates: 52.16033°N 20.5903°E

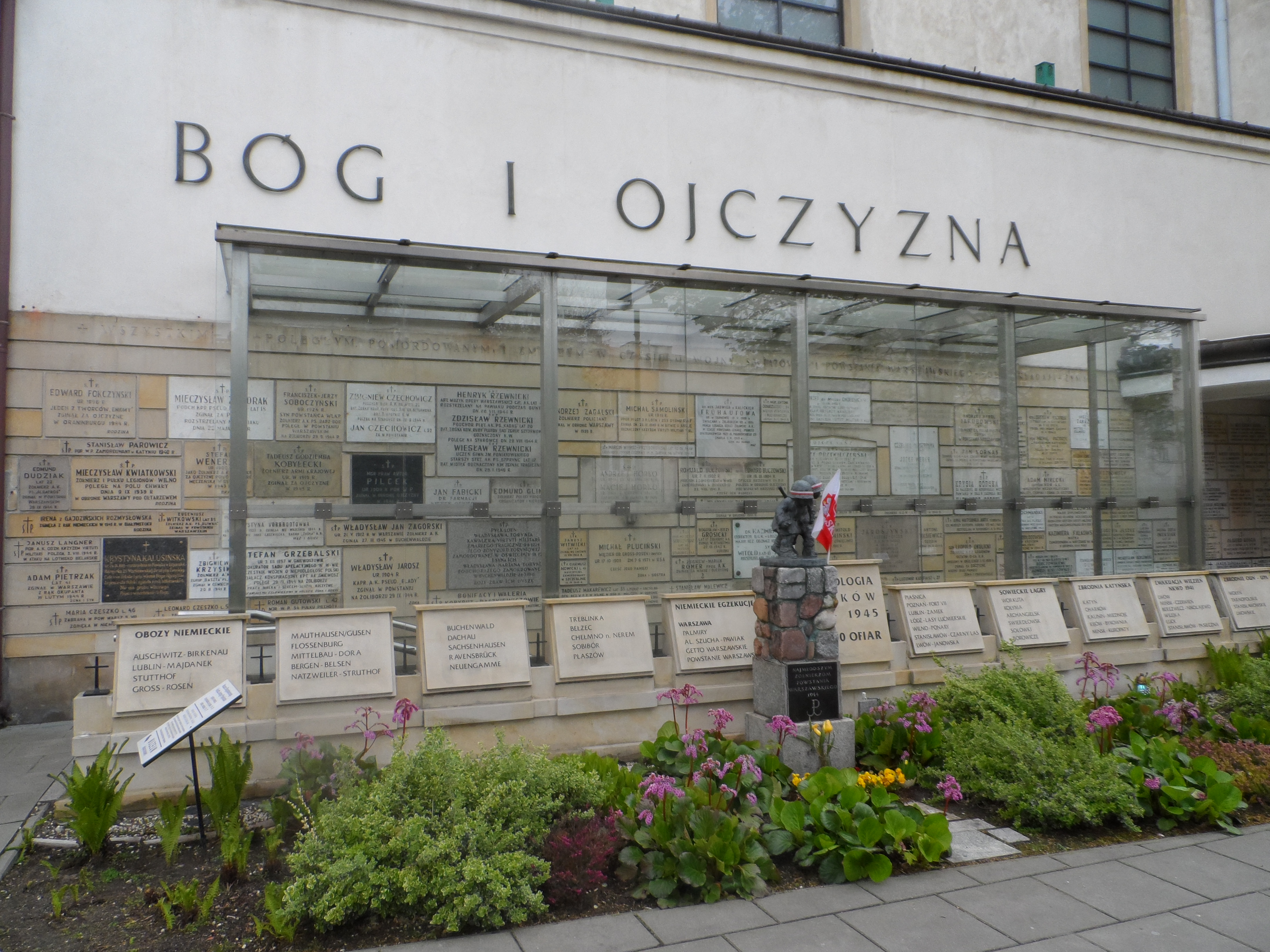
- Established: 2004
- Location: Kardynała Stanisława Hozjusza 2; 01-565; Warsaw, Poland
- Website: https://muzeumkspopieluszki.pl/

The Father Jerzy Popiełuszko Museum in Warsaw is a museum dedicated to Father Jerzy Popiełuszko, a priest, blessed and martyr of the Catholic Church. The museum is located on the premises of St. Stanislaus Kostka Church in Warsaw (2 Hozjusza Street), where Father Jerzy Popiełuszko served from 1980 to 1984.

The museum was established in 2004 on the initiative of the then parish priest, Monsignor Zygmunt Malacki. Nine museum rooms contain several thousand exhibits, including Father Jerzy's personal belongings, items related to his martyrdom, photographs, film and audio presentations. In 2019, the museum was visited by 57,000 people, including 7,000 foreigners.

== See also ==
- Museum of Martyrdom of the Blessed Father Jerzy Popiełuszko
