= Błotka =

- Village
- Location within Poland
- Coordinates: 53°2′10″N 18°29′49″E
- Country: Poland
- Voivodeship: Kuyavian-Pomeranian
- County: Toruń
- Gmina: Zławieś Wielka
- Population: 40

Błotka [ˈbwɔtka] is a village in the administrative district of Gmina Zławieś Wielka, within Toruń County, Kuyavian-Pomeranian Voivodeship, in north-central Poland.
