= Pokrzywno, Toruń County =

Pokrzywno
- Village
- Location within Poland
- Coordinates: 52°53′27″N 18°54′16″E
- Country: Poland
- Voivodeship: Kuyavian-Pomeranian
- County: Toruń
- Gmina: Czernikowo

Pokrzywno [pɔˈkʂɨvnɔ] is a village in the administrative district of Gmina Czernikowo, within Toruń County, Kuyavian-Pomeranian Voivodeship, in north-central Poland.
