= Smolno, Kuyavian-Pomeranian Voivodeship =

Smolno
- Village
- Location within Poland
- Coordinates: 53°4′3″N 18°23′19″E
- Country: Poland
- Voivodeship: Kuyavian-Pomeranian
- County: Toruń
- Gmina: Zławieś Wielka

Smolno ([ˈsmɔlnɔ]; German: Schmolln) is a village in the administrative district of Gmina Zławieś Wielka, within Toruń County, Kuyavian-Pomeranian Voivodeship, in north-central Poland.
