= Berend von Wetter-Rosenthal =

Baltic German politician

Berend (von) Wetter-Rosenthal (8 November 1874, Tallinn – 10 March 1940 Krughof (Kijazkowo), Reichsgau Wartheland, Nazi Germany) was a Baltic-German politician. He was a member of I Riigikogu. He was a member of the Riigikogu since 10 January 1923. He replaced Georg Rudolf Stackelberg.
