= Monument commemorating the kidnapping and assassination of Father Popiełuszko =

Coordinates: 53°02′52″N 18°27′32″E

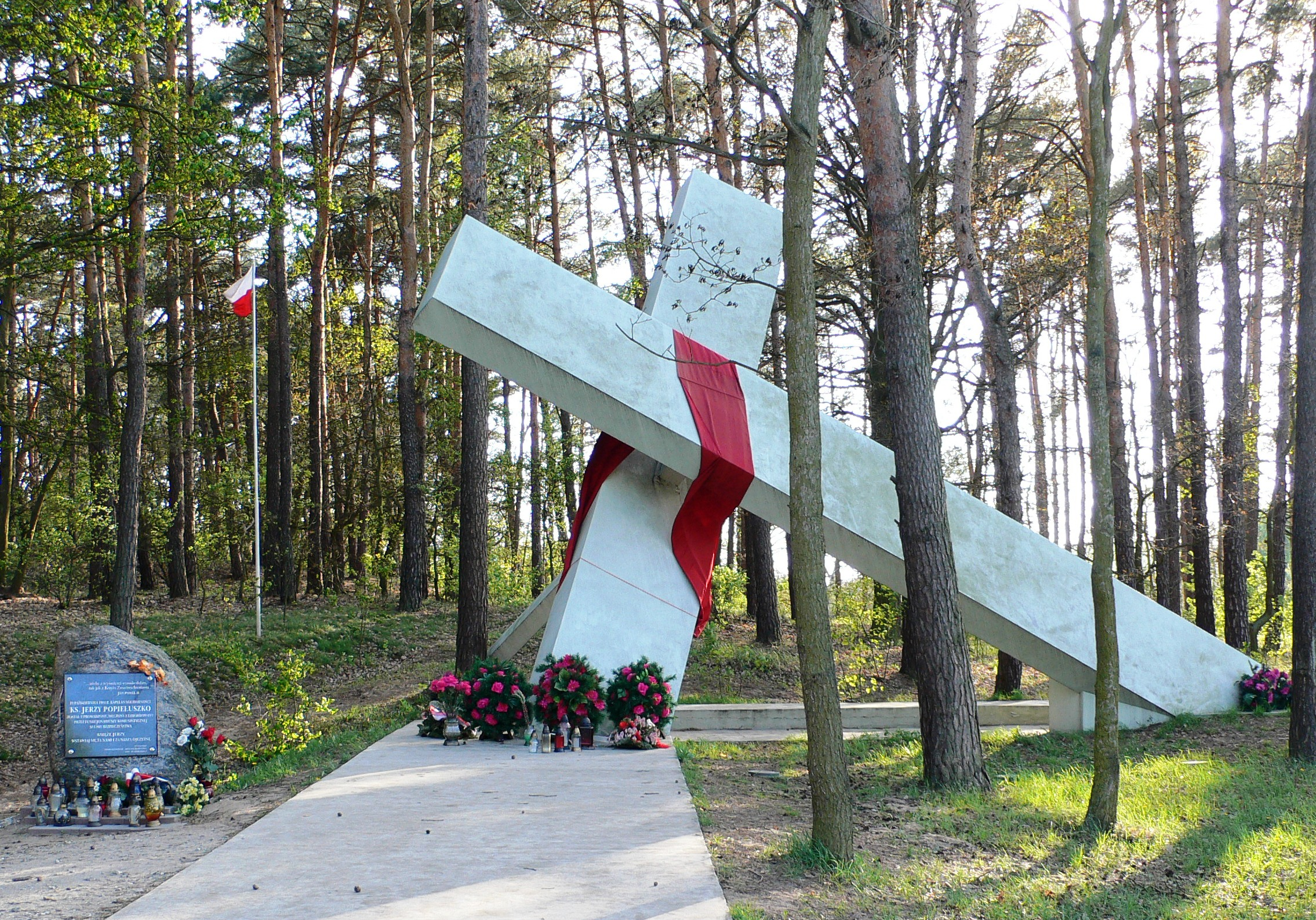
- Interactive map of Monument commemorating the kidnapping and assassination of Father Popiełuszko
- Location: Górsk, Poland
- Completion date: 25 November 2000

Monument commemorating the kidnapping and assassination of Father Popiełuszko in Górsk is a monument commemorating the kidnapping and assassination of Father Jerzy Popiełuszko. It is located in a forest near Górsk, by national road No. 80 connecting Toruń and Bydgoszcz.

The monument is made of reinforced concrete. It has the shape of a slanted cross measuring 8 m by 6 m. Underneath the cross are the words: Whoever wants to follow Me, let him take up his cross. Next to the cross stands a statue of Jesus Christ the Pensive.

== History ==
The idea of creating the monument arose shortly after the abduction and murder of Father Jerzy Popiełuszko by Security Service officers on 19 October 1984. The design for the monument was selected that same year from among three entries submitted to a competition announced by a committee chaired by Bishop Marian Przykucki. The design was developed by a team of Warsaw artists consisting of Anna and Krystian Jarnuszkiewicz, Grzegorz Kowalski, and Prof. Maciej Kysiak (who was the team leader). During the communist era, the church authorities tried unsuccessfully to obtain permission to erect a cross in Górsk. A priest, who was a secret collaborator operating under the pseudonym Klemens, was introduced to the monument construction committee. His task was to influence the design so that the cross would be as inconspicuous as possible. According to reports by Klemens, Father Józef Nowakowski, who ran the Toruń branch of the Primate's Committee for Aid to Repressed Persons, encouraged clergymen to erect the cross illegally if permission was not granted. If it was removed, another one was to be erected.

Wooden crosses were erected at the site where the monument now stands, but they were regularly removed by Security Service officers. The first cross was erected on 21 October 1984. It was removed after five days. To make it more difficult to erect new crosses, a no stopping and no parking sign was placed on the road and the wide shoulders at the site where the abduction probably took place. The ban was enforced by Citizens' Militia officers patrolling the road

The monument was unveiled on 25 November 2000. It was erected at the site where the abduction is believed to have taken place. In 2015, the monument was renovated and a parking lot was built nearby.

== See also ==
- Museum of Martyrdom of the Blessed Father Jerzy Popiełuszko
- Memorial Room of Father Jerzy Popiełuszko in Suchowola
