= Gmina Czernikowo =

Gmina Czernikowo Czernikowo Commune
- Gmina
- Flag Coat of arms

- Location within Poland
- Coordinates (Czernikowo): 52°57′N 18°56′E
- Country: Poland
- Voivodeship: Kuyavian-Pomeranian
- County: Toruń County
- Seat: Czernikowo

Area
  - Total: 169.37 km^{2} (65.39 sq mi)

Population (2006)
  - Total: 8,378
  - Density: 49.47/km^{2} (128.1/sq mi)
- Website: http://www.czernikowo.pl

Gmina Czernikowo is a rural gmina (administrative district) in Toruń County, Kuyavian-Pomeranian Voivodeship, in north-central Poland. Its seat is the village of Czernikowo, which lies approximately 24 kilometres (15 mi) south-east of Toruń.

The gmina covers an area of 169.37 square kilometres (65.4 sq mi), and as of 2006 its total population is 8,378.

== Villages ==
Gmina Czernikowo contains the villages and settlements of Czernikówko, Czernikowo, Jackowo, Kiełpiny, Kijaszkowo, Liciszewy, Makowiska, Mazowsze, Mazowsze-Parcele, Osówka, Pokrzywno, Skwirynowo, Steklin, Steklinek, Witowąż, Wygoda and Zimny Zdrój.

== Neighbouring gminas ==
Gmina Czernikowo is bordered by the towns of Ciechocinek and Nieszawa, and by the gminas of Bobrowniki, Ciechocin, Kikół, Lipno, Obrowo, Raciążek and Zbójno.
