= Skwirynowo =

- Village
- Location within Poland
- Coordinates: 52°53′21″N 18°54′50″E
- Country: Poland
- Voivodeship: Kuyavian-Pomeranian
- County: Toruń
- Gmina: Czernikowo

Skwirynowo [skfirɨˈnɔvɔ] is a village in the administrative district of Gmina Czernikowo, within Toruń County, Kuyavian-Pomeranian Voivodeship in north-central Poland.
