= Przysiek, Gmina Zławieś Wielka =

Przysiek
- Village
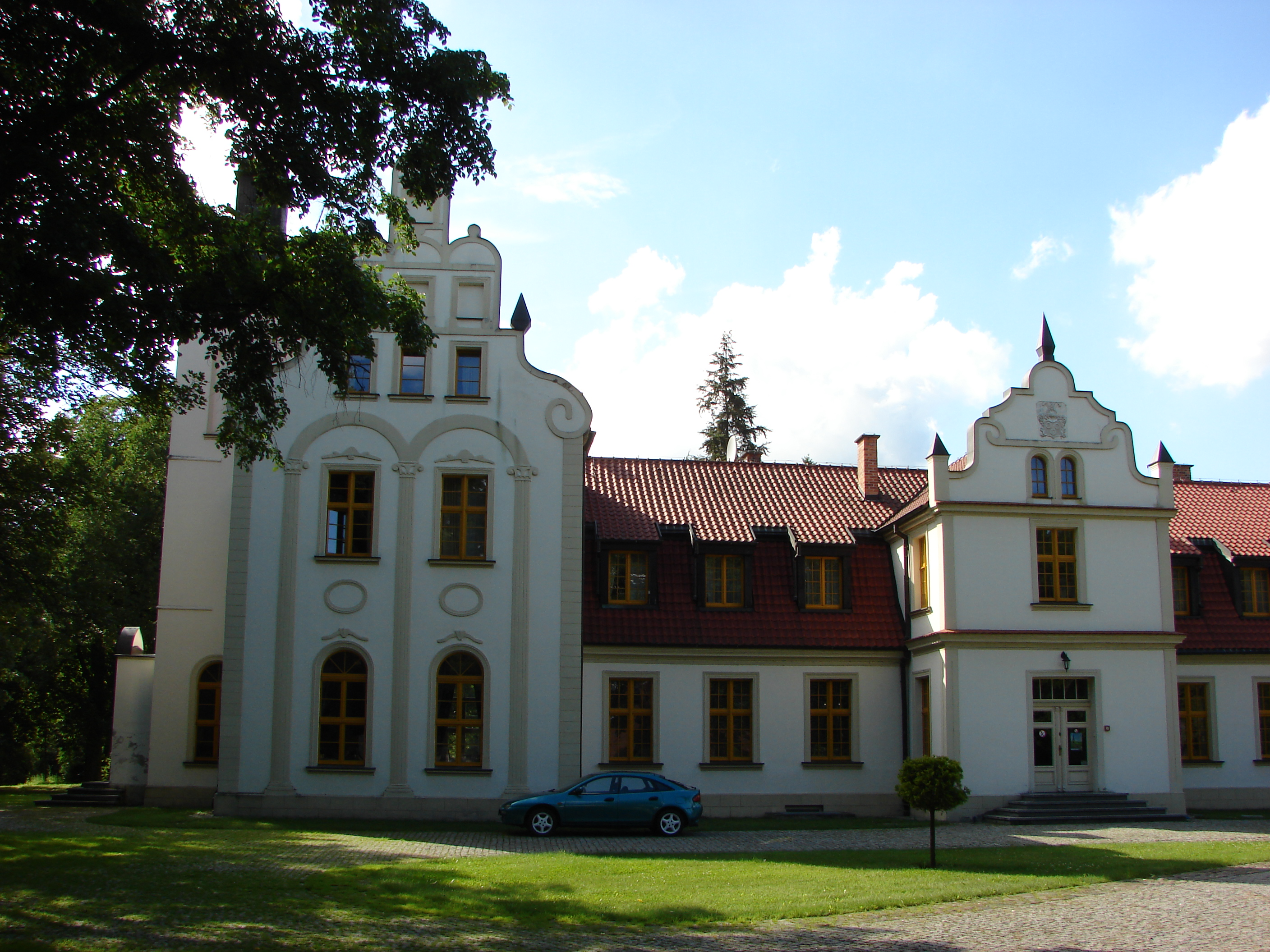
- The manor house, completed in 1793.

- Location within Poland
- Coordinates: 53°2′N 18°30′E
- Country: Poland
- Voivodeship: Kuyavian-Pomeranian
- County: Toruń
- Gmina: Zławieś Wielka

Przysiek [ˈpʂɨɕɛk] is a village in the administrative district of Gmina Zławieś Wielka, within Toruń County, Kuyavian-Pomeranian Voivodeship, in north-central Poland.
