= Osówka, Kuyavian-Pomeranian Voivodeship =

Osówka
- Village
- Location within Poland
- Coordinates: 52°55′N 18°59′E
- Country: Poland
- Voivodeship: Kuyavian-Pomeranian
- County: Toruń
- Gmina: Czernikowo

Osówka [ɔˈsufka] is a village in the administrative district of Gmina Czernikowo, within Toruń County, Kuyavian-Pomeranian Voivodeship, in north-central Poland.
