= Mazowsze (disambiguation) =

Mazowsze may refer to:

- Masovia, a geographic and historic region of Poland
- Mazowsze (folk group)
- Mazowsze, Kuyavian-Pomeranian Voivodeship, a village in north-central Poland
- Masovian Voivodeship, a province of Poland
