= Kiełpiny, Toruń County =

Kiełpiny
- Village
- Location within Poland
- Coordinates: 52°53′48″N 19°01′38″E
- Country: Poland
- Voivodeship: Kuyavian-Pomeranian
- County: Toruń
- Gmina: Czernikowo

Kiełpiny [kʲɛu̯ˈpinɨ] is a village in the administrative district of Gmina Czernikowo, within Toruń County, Kuyavian-Pomeranian Voivodeship, in north-central Poland.
