= Zimny Zdrój =

- Village
- Location within Poland
- Coordinates: 52°55′54″N 18°54′10″E
- Country: Poland
- Voivodeship: Kuyavian-Pomeranian
- County: Toruń
- Gmina: Czernikowo

Zimny Zdrój [ˈʑimnɨ ˈzdrui̯] is a village in the administrative district of Gmina Czernikowo, within Toruń County, Kuyavian-Pomeranian Voivodeship, in north-central Poland.
