= Jackowo =

Jackowo may refer to:

- Avondale, Chicago
- Jackowo, Kuyavian-Pomeranian Voivodeship (north-central Poland)
- Jackowo, Pomeranian Voivodeship (north Poland)
