= Gutowo-Leśnictwo =

- Village
- Location within Poland
- Coordinates: 53°3′58″N 18°23′29″E
- Country: Poland
- Voivodeship: Kuyavian-Pomeranian
- County: Toruń
- Gmina: Zławieś Wielka

Gutowo-Leśnictwo [ɡuˈtɔvɔ lɛɕˈnit͡stfɔ] is a village in the administrative district of Gmina Zławieś Wielka, within Toruń County, Kuyavian-Pomeranian Voivodeship, in north-central Poland.
