= Siemoń =

- Village
- Location within Poland
- Coordinates: 53°10′N 18°24′E
- Country: Poland
- Voivodeship: Kuyavian-Pomeranian
- County: Toruń
- Gmina: Zławieś Wielka
- Population (approx.): 800

Siemoń [ˈɕɛmɔɲ] is a village in the administrative district of Gmina Zławieś Wielka, within Toruń County, Kuyavian-Pomeranian Voivodeship, in north-central Poland.

The village has an approximate population of 800.
