= Gutowo, Toruń County =

Gutowo
- Village
- Location within Poland
- Coordinates: 53°7′N 18°22′E
- Country: Poland
- Voivodeship: Kuyavian-Pomeranian
- County: Toruń
- Gmina: Zławieś Wielka

Gutowo [ɡuˈtɔvɔ] is a village in the administrative district of Gmina Zławieś Wielka, within Toruń County, Kuyavian-Pomeranian Voivodeship, in north-central Poland.
