= Zarośle Cienkie =

- Village
- Location within Poland
- Coordinates: 53°6′N 18°26′E
- Country: Poland
- Voivodeship: Kuyavian-Pomeranian
- County: Toruń
- Gmina: Zławieś Wielka

Zarośle Cienkie [zaˈrɔɕlɛ ˈt͡ɕɛŋkʲɛ] is a village in the administrative district of Gmina Zławieś Wielka, within Toruń County, Kuyavian-Pomeranian Voivodeship, in north-central Poland.
