= Gmina Zławieś Wielka =

Gmina Zławieś Wielka Zławieś Wielka Commune
- Gmina
- Flag Coat of arms

- Location within Poland
- Coordinates (Zławieś Wielka): 53°5′N 18°20′E
- Country: Poland
- Voivodeship: Kuyavian-Pomeranian
- County: Toruń County
- Seat: Zławieś Wielka

Area
  - Total: 177.53 km^{2} (68.54 sq mi)

Population (2006)
  - Total: 11,408
  - Density: 64.260/km^{2} (166.43/sq mi)

Gmina Zławieś Wielka is a rural gmina (administrative district) in Toruń County, Kuyavian-Pomeranian Voivodeship, in north-central Poland. Its seat is the village of Zławieś Wielka, which lies approximately 20 kilometres (12 mi) west of Toruń and 23 km (14 mi) east of Bydgoszcz.

The gmina covers an area of 177.53 square kilometres (68.5 sq mi), and as of 2006 its total population is 11,408.

== Villages ==
Gmina Zławieś Wielka contains the villages and settlements of Błotka, Borek, Cegielnik, Cichoradz, Czarne Błoto, Czarnowo, Doły Łążyńskie, Gierkowo, Górsk, Gutowo, Gutowo-Leśnictwo, Kamieniec, Łążyn, Łążynek, Pędzewo, Przysiek, Rozgarty, Rzęczkowo, Siemoń, Skłudzewo, Smolno, Stanisławka, Stary Toruń, Szerokie, Toporzysko, Zarośle Cienkie, Zławieś Mała and Zławieś Wielka.

== Neighbouring gminas ==
Gmina Zławieś Wielka is bordered by the towns of Bydgoszcz and Toruń, and by the gminas of Dąbrowa Chełmińska, Łubianka, Łysomice, Solec Kujawski, Unisław and Wielka Nieszawka.
