= Cichoradz =

- Village
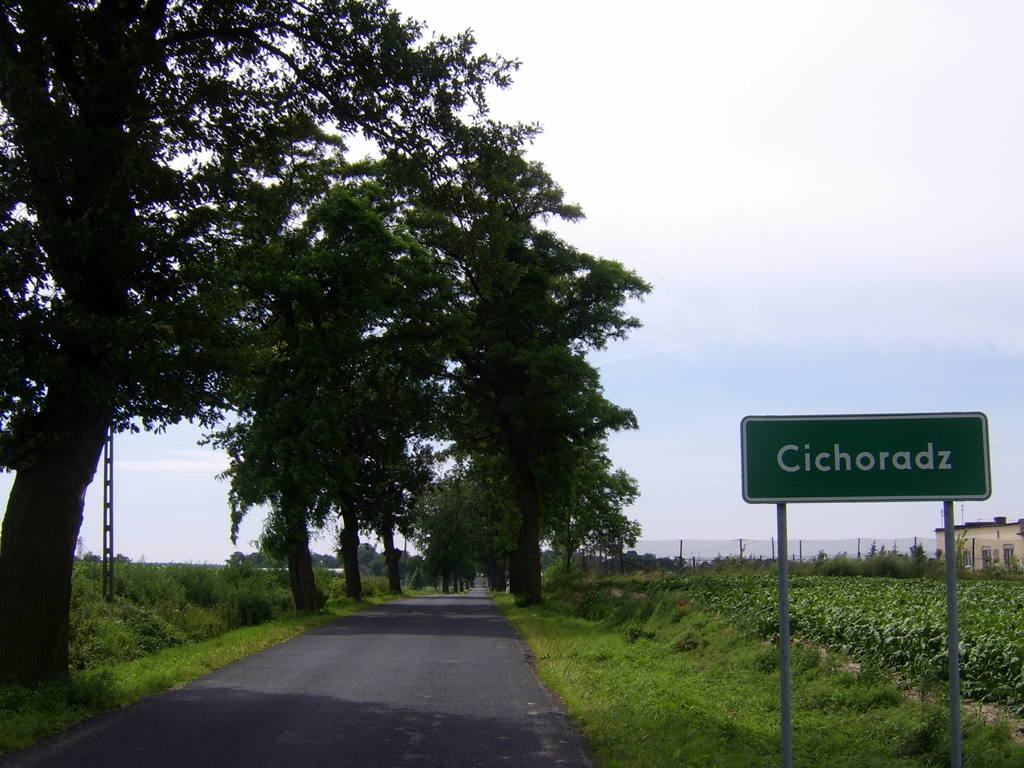
- Road sign to Cichoradz

- Location within Poland
- Coordinates: 53°09′00″N 18°21′00″E
- Country: Poland
- Voivodeship: Kuyavian-Pomeranian
- County: Toruń
- Gmina: Zławieś Wielka
- Population: 301

Cichoradz [t͡ɕiˈxɔrat͡s] is a village in the administrative district of Gmina Zławieś Wielka, within Toruń County, Kuyavian-Pomeranian Voivodeship, in north-central Poland.
