= Mazowsze, Kuyavian-Pomeranian Voivodeship =

Mazowsze
- Village
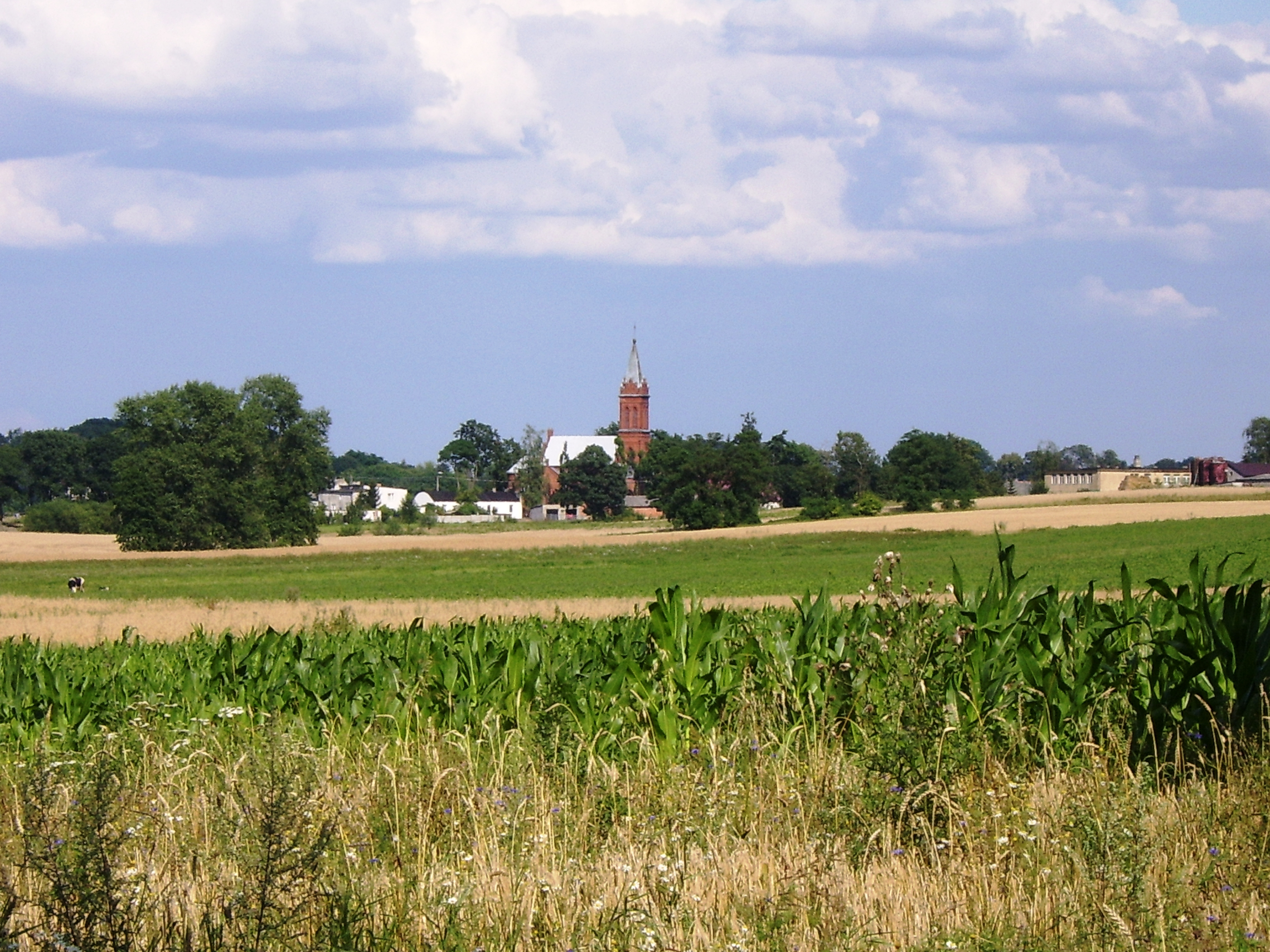
- Panorama of Mazowsze

- Location within Poland
- Coordinates: 52°58′00″N 19°01′00″E
- Country: Poland
- Voivodeship: Kuyavian-Pomeranian
- County: Toruń
- Gmina: Czernikowo
- Time zone: UTC+1 (CET)
  - Summer (DST): UTC+2 (CEST)
- Vehicle registration: CTR

Mazowsze [maˈzɔfʂɛ] is a village in the administrative district of Gmina Czernikowo, within Toruń County, Kuyavian-Pomeranian Voivodeship, in north-central Poland. It is located in the historic Dobrzyń Land.

During the German occupation of Poland (World War II), Mazowsze was one of the sites of executions of Poles, carried out by the Germans in 1939 as part of the Intelligenzaktion.
