= Skłudzewo =

- Village
- Location within Poland
- Coordinates: 53°9′N 18°20′E
- Country: Poland
- Voivodeship: Kuyavian-Pomeranian
- County: Toruń
- Gmina: Zławieś Wielka
- Population: 238

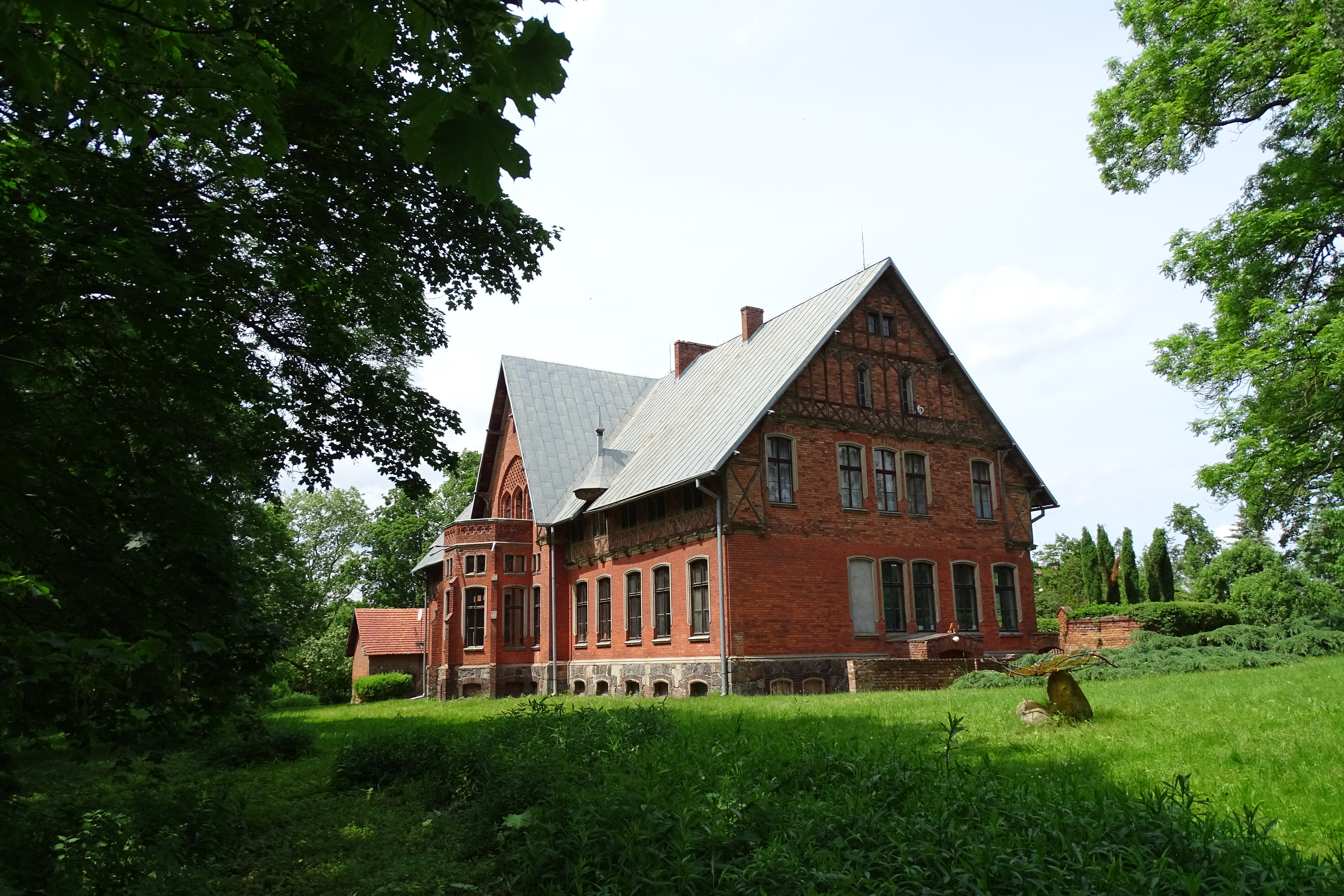
19th century manor house.

Skłudzewo [skwuˈd͡zɛvɔ] is a village in the administrative district of Gmina Zławieś Wielka, within Toruń County, Kuyavian-Pomeranian Voivodeship, in north-central Poland.
