= Memorial Room of Father Jerzy Popiełuszko in Suchowola =

Coordinates: 53°34′36″N 23°6′6″E

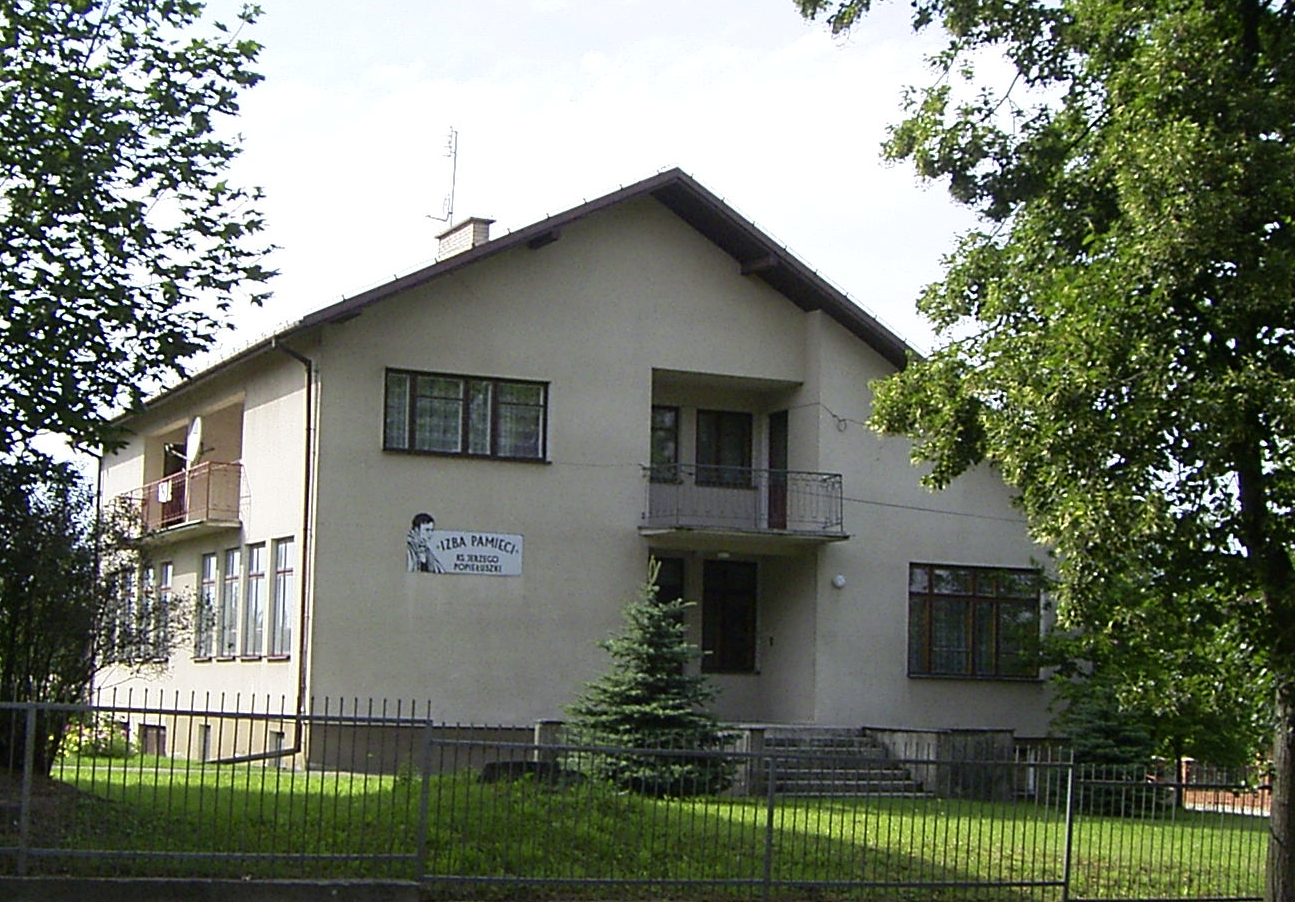
- Established: 1986
- Location: Suchowola, Poland
- Type: biographical collections

The Memorial Chamber of Father Jerzy Popiełuszko in Suchowola is a museum chamber located in Suchowola, based at the parish of St. Peter and Paul the Apostles. Its collections are dedicated to the blessed Father Jerzy Popiełuszko, who was born in nearby Okopy.

The chamber was opened in 1986. It is located in the rectory. The collection includes memorabilia of the priest, including his portraits, photographs, and school ID card. There is also a table from the morgue in Białystok, where the autopsy of the murdered man was performed.

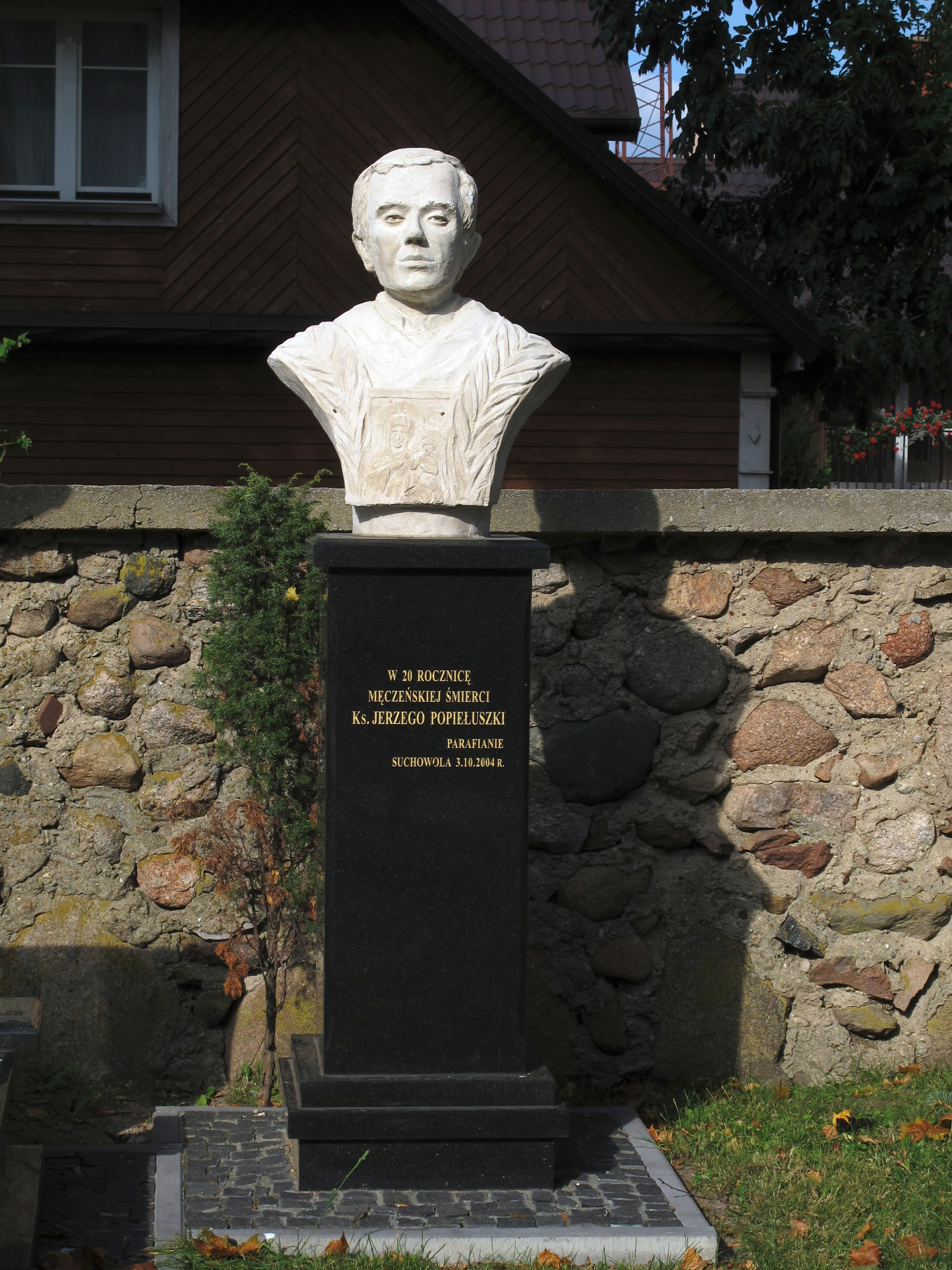
Monument to Father Jerzy Popiełuszko at the church in Suchowola

Visits to the chamber are possible by prior arrangement.

== Bibliography ==
- "Izba Pamięci ks. Jerzego Popiełuszki". www.suchowola.bialystok.opoka.org.pl (in Polish).
- "Suchowola. Izba pamięci w środku Europy". www.krajoznawcy.info.pl (in Polish). 2012-03-26.
- "Izbę Pamięci ks. Jerzego Popiełuszki w Suchowoli odwiedza coraz więcej pielgrzymów". www.radio.bialystok.pl (in Polish). 2012-06-30.

== See also ==
- Museum of Martyrdom of the Blessed Father Jerzy Popiełuszko
- Monument commemorating the kidnapping and assassination of Father Popiełuszko
