= Czarne Błoto, Kuyavian-Pomeranian Voivodeship =

Czarne Błoto
- Village
- Location within Poland
- Coordinates: 53°4′N 18°28′E
- Country: Poland
- Voivodeship: Kuyavian-Pomeranian
- County: Toruń
- Gmina: Zławieś Wielka

Czarne Błoto [ˈt͡ʂarnɛ ˈbwɔtɔ] is a village in the administrative district of Gmina Zławieś Wielka, within Toruń County, Kuyavian-Pomeranian Voivodeship, in north-central Poland.
