= Rzęczkowo =

- Village
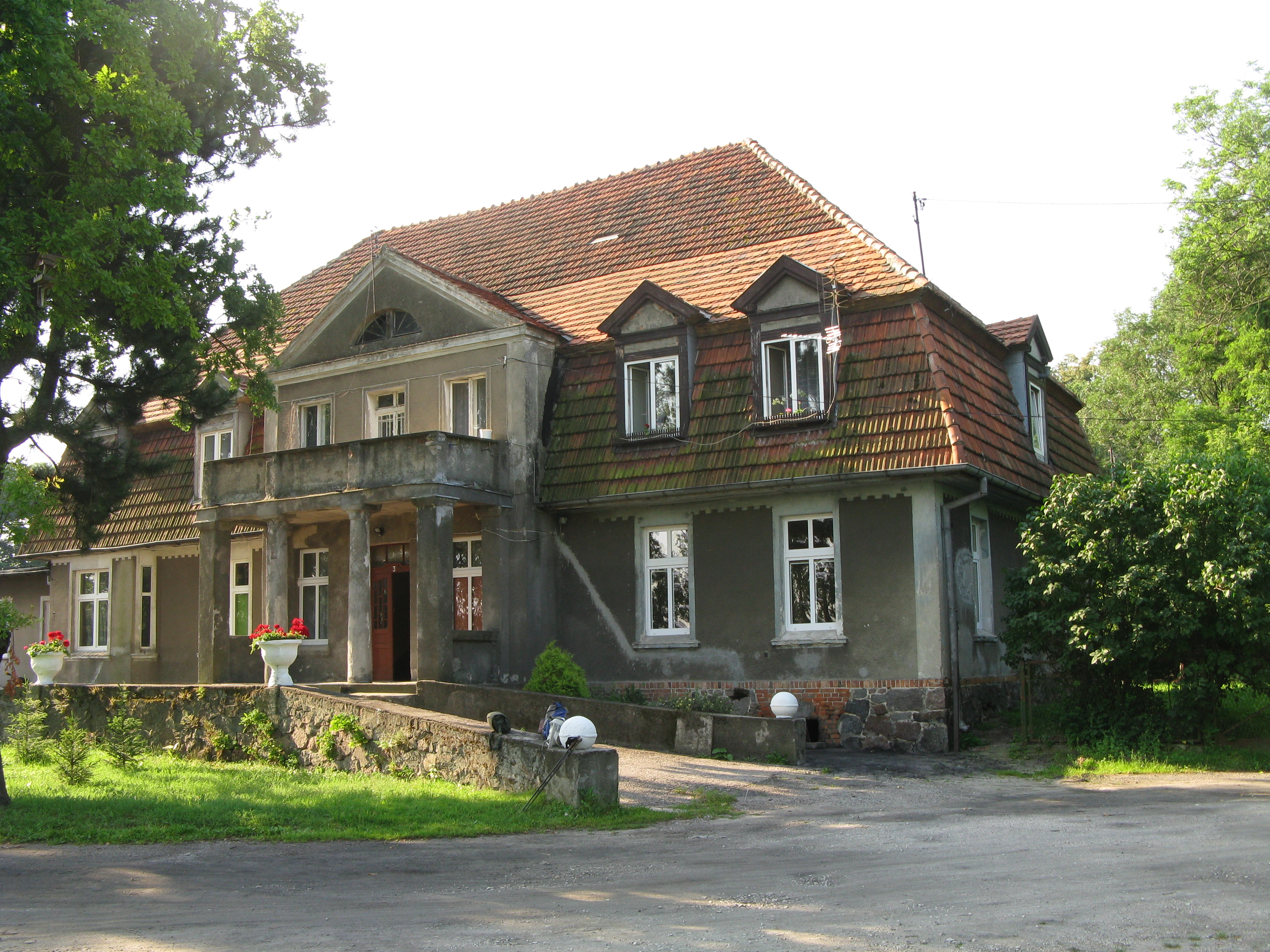
- Old manor house in Rzęczkowo

- Location within Poland
- Coordinates: 53°07′44″N 18°22′01″E
- Country: Poland
- Voivodeship: Kuyavian-Pomeranian
- County: Toruń
- Gmina: Zławieś Wielka
- Population: 800
- Time zone: UTC+1 (CET)
  - Summer (DST): UTC+2 (CEST)
- Vehicle registration: CTR

Rzęczkowo [ʐɛnt͡ʂˈkɔvɔ] is a village in the administrative district of Gmina Zławieś Wielka, within Toruń County, Kuyavian-Pomeranian Voivodeship, in north-central Poland. It is located in Chełmno Land within the historic region of Pomerania.

== History ==
The area became part of the emerging Polish state in the 10th century. There were two medieval strongholds, which are now protected archaeological sites.

During the German occupation of Poland (World War II), Rzęczkowo was one of the sites of executions of Poles, carried out by the Germans in 1939 as part of the Intelligenzaktion.

== Education ==
There is a primary school in Rzęczkowo.
