= Czernikowo =

- Village
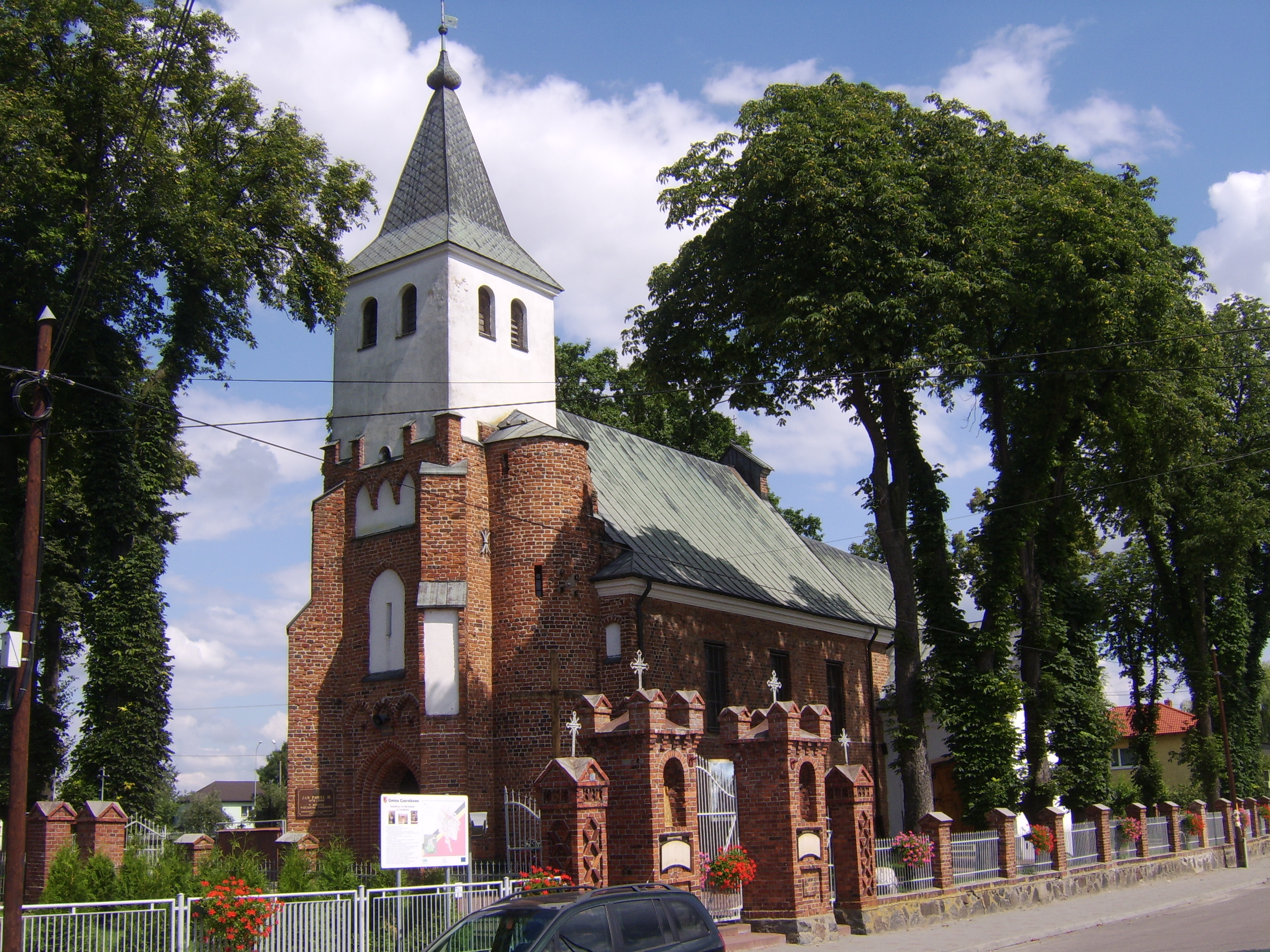
- Saint Bartholomew Church

- Coat of arms

- Location within Poland
- Coordinates: 52°57′N 18°56′E
- Country: Poland
- Voivodeship: Kuyavian-Pomeranian
- County: Toruń
- Gmina: Czernikowo
- Population: 2,752
- Time zone: UTC+1 (CET)
  - Summer (DST): UTC+2 (CEST)
- Vehicle registration: CTR
- Website: https://www.czernikowo.pl

Czernikowo (Polish pronunciation: [t͡ʂɛrniˈkɔvɔ]) is a village in Toruń County, Kuyavian-Pomeranian Voivodeship, in north-central Poland. It is the seat of the gmina (administrative district) called Gmina Czernikowo. It is located in the historic Dobrzyń Land.

== History ==
During the German occupation of Poland (World War II), Czernikowo was one of the sites of executions of Poles, carried out by the Germans in 1939 as part of the Intelligenzaktion.

== Education ==
There is a primary school and a general education liceum (high school) in Czernikowo.
