= Łążyn, Gmina Zławieś Wielka =

Łążyn
- Village
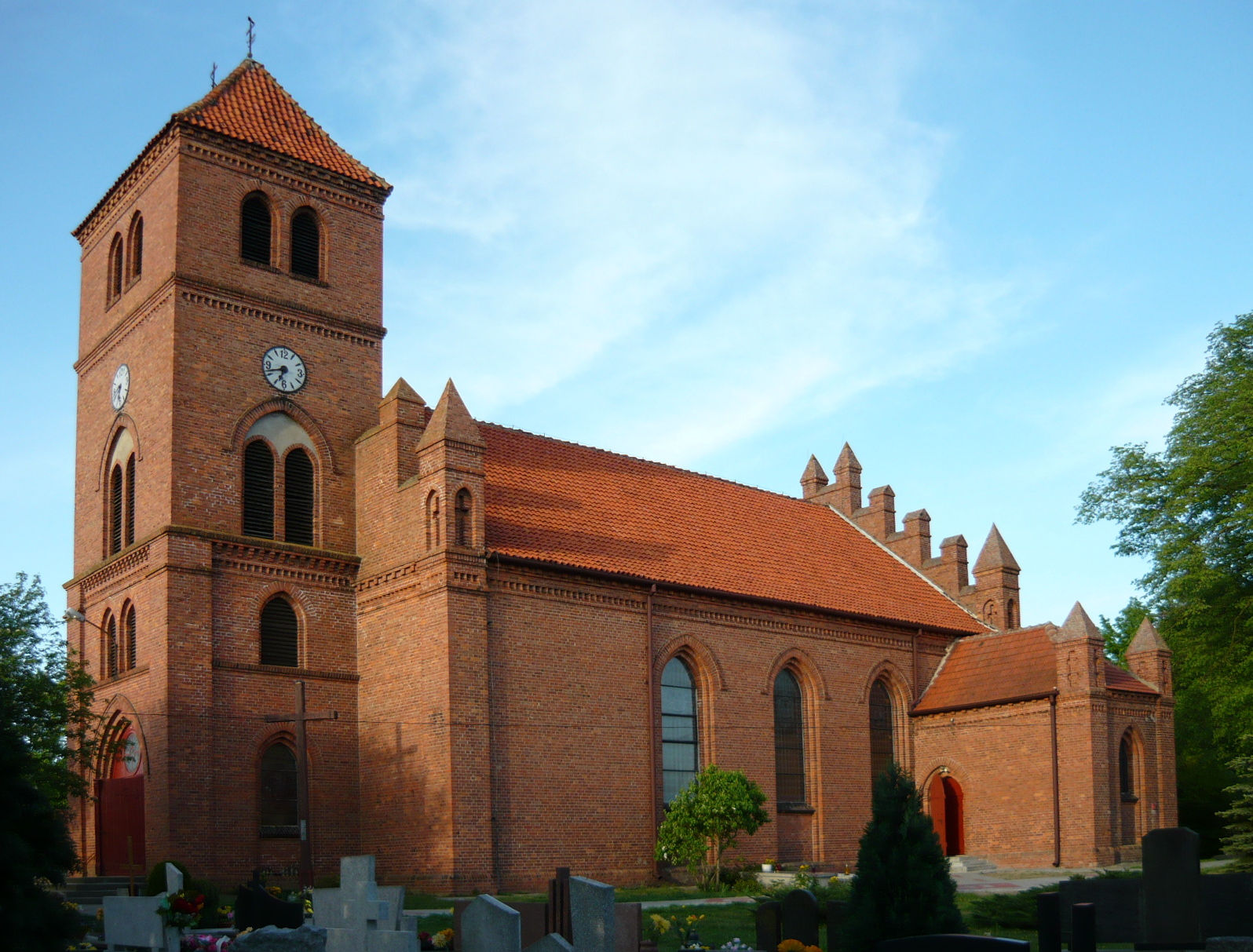

- Location within Poland
- Coordinates: 53°07′38″N 18°25′29″E
- Country: Poland
- Voivodeship: Kuyavian-Pomeranian
- County: Toruń
- Gmina: Zławieś Wielka

Łążyn [ˈwɔ̃ʐɨn] (German Lonzyn) is a village in the administrative district of Gmina Zławieś Wielka, within Toruń County, Kuyavian-Pomeranian Voivodeship, in north-central Poland.

== Notable people ==
- Moritz von Rohr (1868–1940), optical scientist
