= Zławieś Mała =

- Village
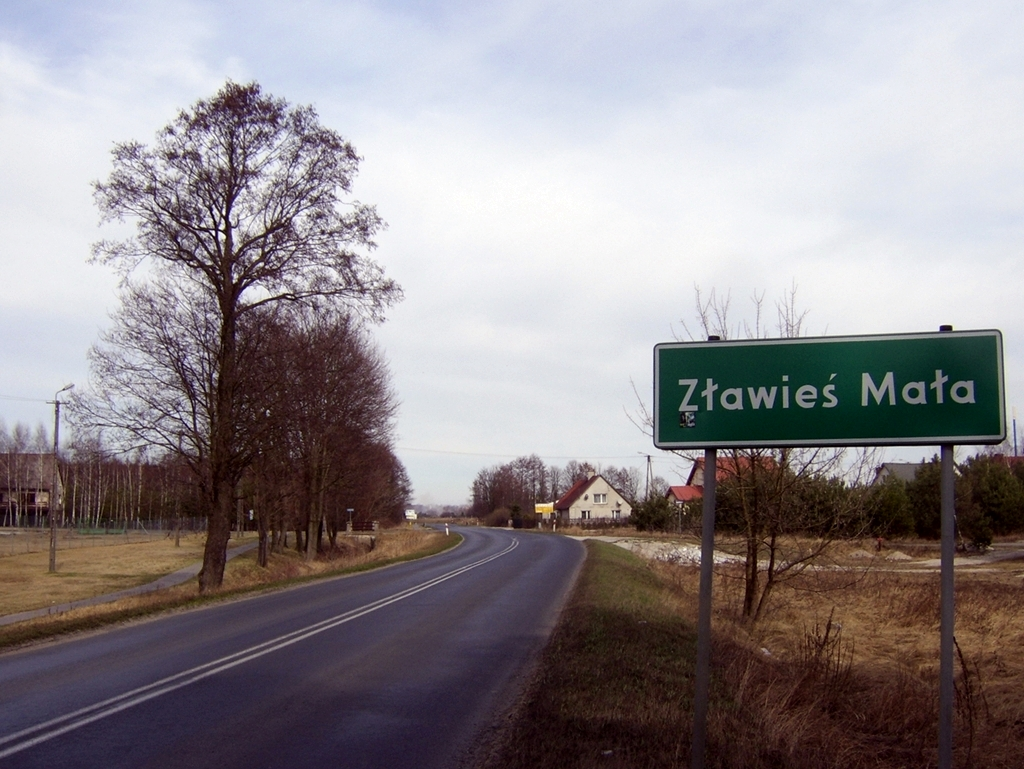
- Entrance to the village

- Location within Poland
- Coordinates: 53°06′19″N 18°20′33″E
- Country: Poland
- Voivodeship: Kuyavian-Pomeranian
- County: Toruń
- Gmina: Zławieś Wielka
- Time zone: UTC+1 (CET)
  - Summer (DST): UTC+2 (CEST)
- Vehicle registration: CTR

Zławieś Mała [ˈzwavjɛɕ ˈmawa] is a village in the administrative district of Gmina Zławieś Wielka, within Toruń County, Kuyavian-Pomeranian Voivodeship, in north-central Poland.

== History ==
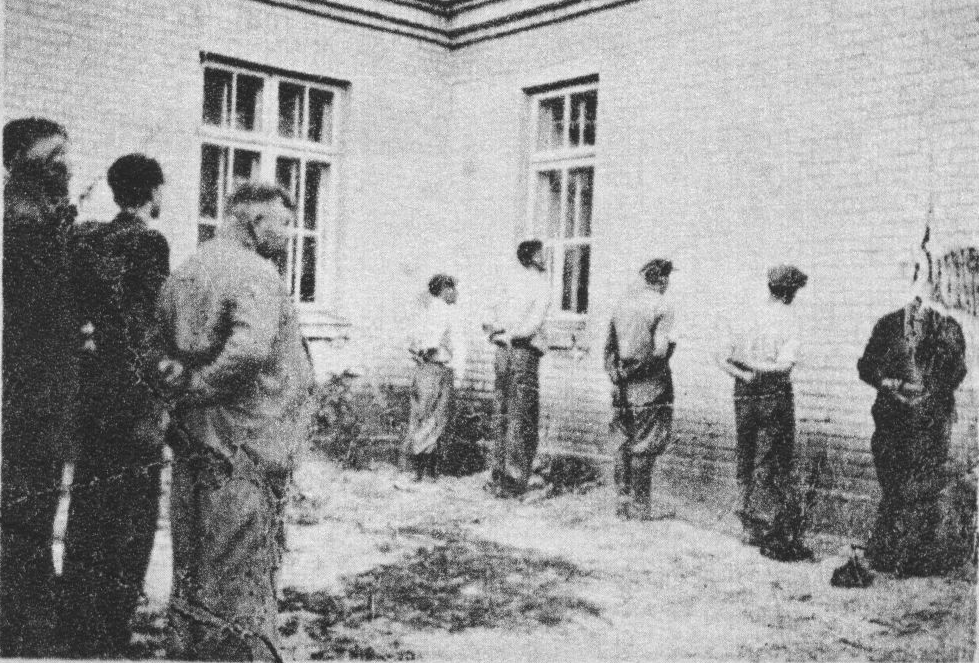
Executions of Poles in Zławieś Mała by the German Selbstschutz during World War II

During the German occupation of Poland (World War II), Zławieś Mała was one of the sites of executions of Poles, carried out by the Germans in 1939 as part of the Intelligenzaktion.

== Transport ==
The Voivodeship road 546 passes through the village, and the Polish National road 80 runs nearby, south of the village.
