= Kijaszkowo, Kuyavian-Pomeranian Voivodeship =

Kijaszkowo
- Village
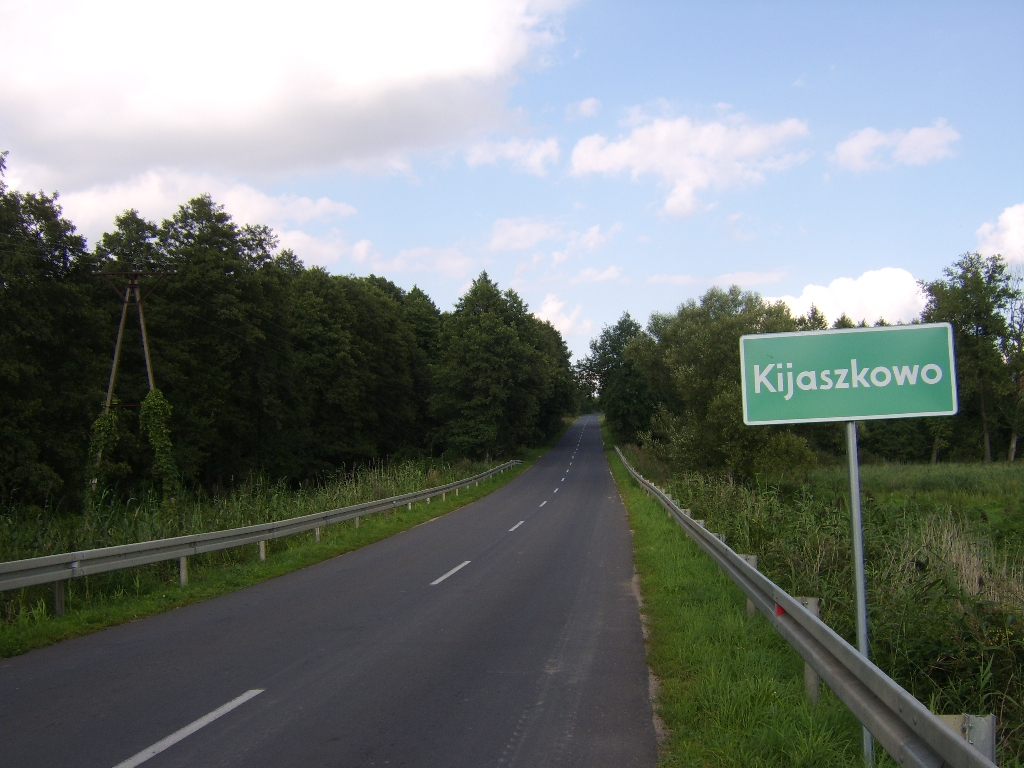
- Entrance to the village

- Location within Poland
- Coordinates: 52°59′23″N 19°2′21″E
- Country: Poland
- Voivodeship: Kuyavian-Pomeranian
- County: Toruń
- Gmina: Czernikowo
- Time zone: UTC+1 (CET)
  - Summer (DST): UTC+2 (CEST)
- Vehicle registration: CTR

Kijaszkowo [kijaʂˈkɔvɔ] is a village in the administrative district of Gmina Czernikowo, within Toruń County, Kuyavian-Pomeranian Voivodeship, in north-central Poland.

During the German occupation of Poland (World War II), Kijaszkowo was one of the sites of executions of Poles, carried out by the Germans in 1939 as part of the Intelligenzaktion.
