= Moritz von Rohr =

von Rohr

Von Rohr's method of DOF calculation involves projecting object points to circles of confusion in the field plane (Einstellebene), with reference to the entrance pupil (Eintrittspupille) P. The caption is translated as: "Fig. 20. Concerning depth [of field] with photographic lenses. The upper and lower parts of the figure are identical in the position of the field plane, entrance pupil and the object. The only difference is the diameter of the entrance pupil, the upper being twice the size of the lower. For this reason the upper circles of confusion o1 o2 are also twice the size of the lower ones at the field plane O and the object side image o1 O o2 is twice as blurry as the lower. (By accident the print in the upper field plane O says O1 instead of o1.)"

Moritz von Rohr (4 April 1868 – 20 June 1940) was an optical scientist at Carl Zeiss in Jena, Germany.

A street in Jena is named after him: Moritz-von-Rohr-Straße, near Carl-Zeiss-Promenade and Otto-Schott-Straße.

== Life ==
Moritz von Rohr was born in Lonzyn near Hohensalza, then part of the Prussian Grand Duchy of Posen, but now in Poland and known as Łążyn, near Inowrocław. He obtained a doctorate of philosophy at the University of Berlin in 1892.

== Inventions ==
Von Rohr is usually credited with the design of the first aspheric lenses for eyeglasses. He invented the eyeglass lens designs that became the Zeiss Punktal lenses.

He also developed a method of computing depth of field from a camera's entrance pupil location and diameter, without reference to focal length and f-number (see his 1904 and 1906 books). He says, "At this point it will be sufficient to note that all these formulae involve quantities relating exclusively to the entrance-pupil and its position with respect to the object-point, whereas the focal length of the transforming system does not enter into them." T. R. Dallmeyer refers to Von Rohr’s "interpretation" of depth of field in his 1899 book Telephotography.

Illustration of von Rohr's method for constructing front and near DOF limits from the outside-the-box parameters, aperture diameter d and angular circle of confusion limit e

== Publications ==
According to the Focal Encyclopedia of Photography (1965), "A bibliography of his 571 books and articles was published in Forschungen zur Geschichte der Optik, 1943."

Von Rohr wrote several books on optics, optical instruments, and photographic lenses, in German.

- 1899 Theorie und Geschichte Des Photographischen Objecktivs, Berlin: Verlag von Julius Springer
- 1904 (editor) Die Bilderzeugung in optischen Instrumenten vom Standpunkte der geometrischen Optik, Berlin: J. Springer
- 1906, 1911 Die optischen Instrumente, Leipzig: B. G. Teubner
- 1920 Die binokularen Instrumente, Berlin: J. Springer

The 1899 book was reprinted: Sources of Modern Photography series, New York: Arno Press, 1979.

The 1904 book was translated into English:

- 1920 Geometrical Investigation of the Formation of Images in Optical Instruments, London: H. M. Stationery Office

In 1936 he published a retrospective, "The First Jena Catalogue of Optical Glasses Published in 1886", in Supplement to "Current Science", which is available online.

== Photographs ==
Photographs of von Rohr and more information about him are available on the Zeiss website and the AntiqueSpectacles site.
