= Toporzysko, Kuyavian-Pomeranian Voivodeship =

Toporzysko
- Village
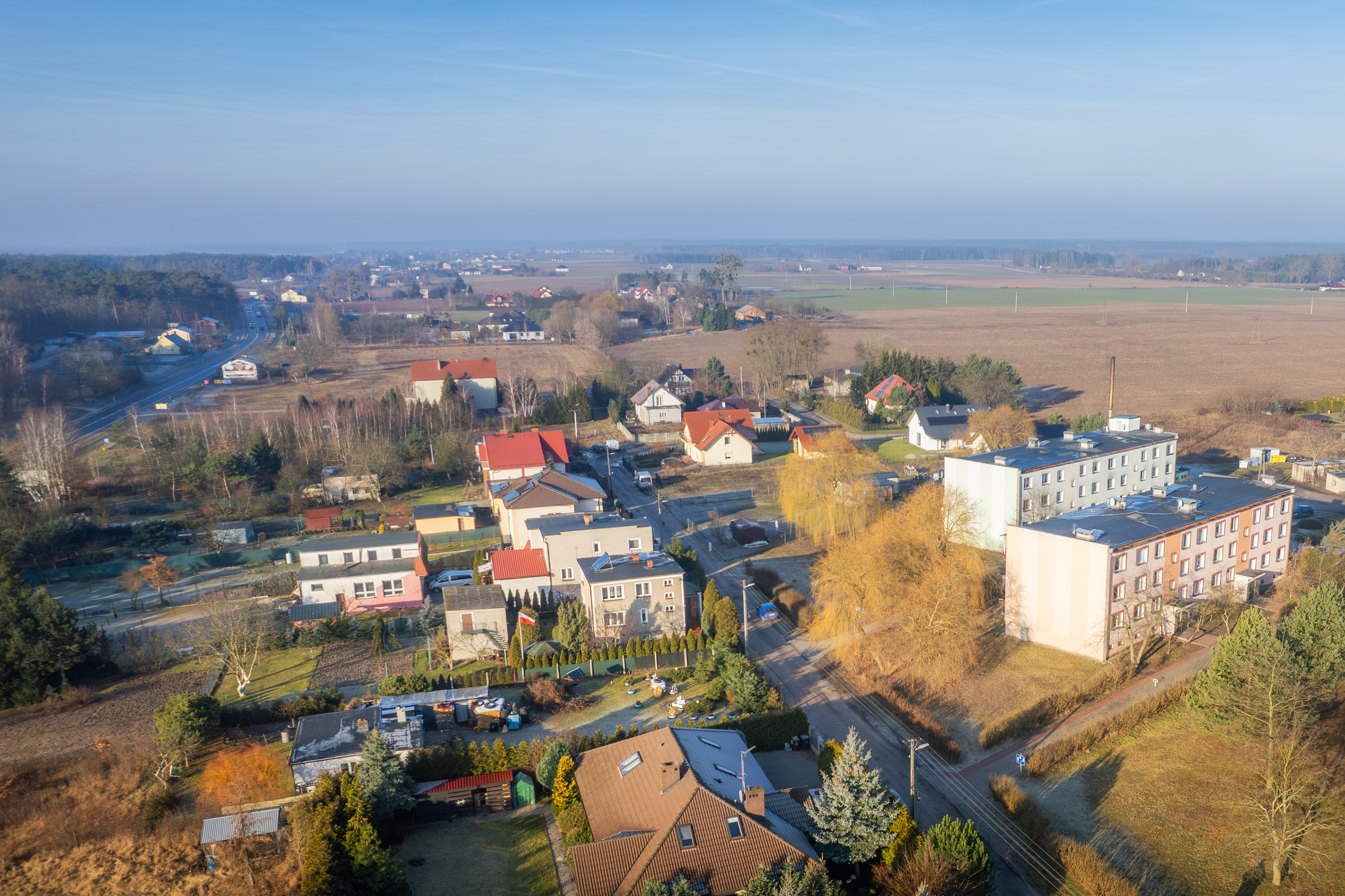
- Aerial view of Toporzysko (2023)

- Location within Poland
- Coordinates: 53°6′0″N 18°18′6″E
- Country: Poland
- Voivodeship: Kuyavian-Pomeranian
- County: Toruń
- Gmina: Zławieś Wielka
- Time zone: UTC+1 (CET)
  - Summer (DST): UTC+2 (CEST)
- Vehicle registration: CTR

Toporzysko [tɔpɔˈʐɨskɔ] is a village in the administrative district of Gmina Zławieś Wielka, within Toruń County, Kuyavian-Pomeranian Voivodeship, in north-central Poland.

Toporzysko was a private village, administratively located in the Chełmno Voivodeship of the Kingdom of Poland.
