= Czarnowo, Kuyavian-Pomeranian Voivodeship =

Czarnowo
- Village
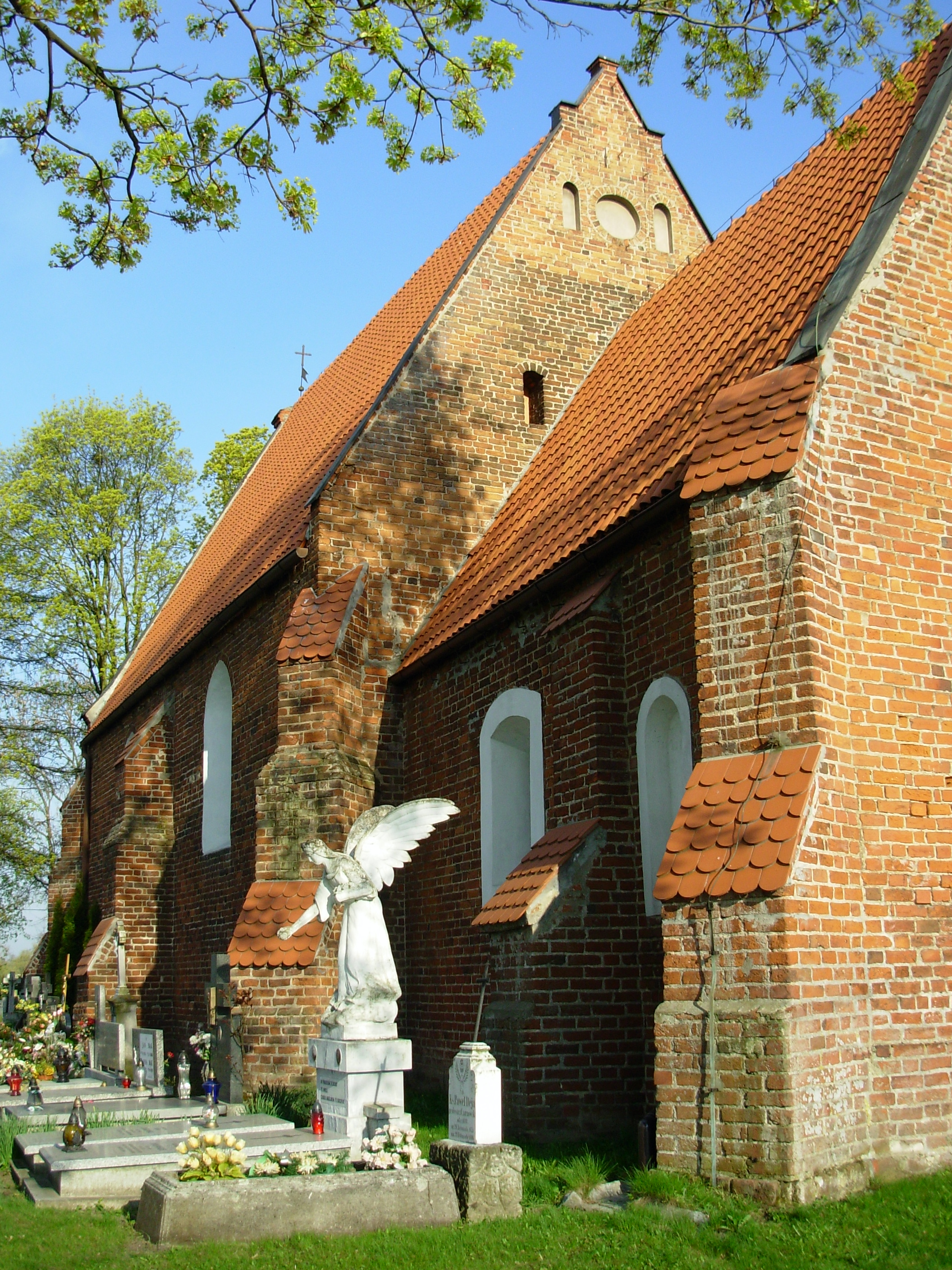
- Saint Martin church in Czarnowo

- Location within Poland
- Coordinates: 53°6′23″N 18°15′4″E
- Country: Poland
- Voivodeship: Kuyavian-Pomeranian
- County: Toruń
- Gmina: Zławieś Wielka
- First mentioned: 1222
- Population: 550
- Time zone: UTC+1 (CET)
  - Summer (DST): UTC+2 (CEST)
- Vehicle registration: CTR

Czarnowo [t͡ʂarˈnɔvɔ] is a village in the administrative district of Gmina Zławieś Wielka, within Toruń County, Kuyavian-Pomeranian Voivodeship, in north-central Poland. It is located on the Vistula in Chełmno Land within the historic region of Pomerania.

The main historic landmark of the village is the medieval Gothic Saint Martin church from the 13th-14th century.

== History ==
The settlement dates back to prehistoric times. It was the location of a defensive settlement in the Iron Age, and a medieval stronghold, both of which are now protected archaeological sites. The area became part of the emerging Polish state in the 10th century. The oldest known mention of the village comes from a document of Duke Konrad I of Masovia from 1222. In 1457, Polish King Casimir IV Jagiellon granted the village to the city of Toruń.

During the German occupation of Poland (World War II), Czarnowo was one of the sites of executions of Poles, carried out by the Germans in 1939 as part of the Intelligenzaktion. The local Polish school principal was murdered by the Germans in the large massacre of Poles committed in the Barbarka forest in Toruń in 1939, also as part of the Intelligenzaktion.

== Education ==
There is a primary school in Czarnowo.
