= Stary Toruń =

- Village
- Location within Poland
- Coordinates: 53°2′N 18°29′E
- Country: Poland
- Voivodeship: Kuyavian-Pomeranian
- County: Toruń
- Gmina: Zławieś Wielka

Stary Toruń (Polish pronunciation: [ˈstarɨ ˈtɔruj̃]; "Old Toruń") is a village in the administrative district of Gmina Zławieś Wielka, within Toruń County, Kuyavian-Pomeranian Voivodeship, in north-central Poland.

The village is the original place of the location of Toruń in 1233, from where it was translocated to the contemporary location after approximately 3 years. According to historic sources, there was a Teutonic Order stronghold together with a settlement and a church (demolished in the 16th century). The exact location of that settlement was discovered and researched by an interdisciplinary team of archaeologists and historians in 2018, just South of the village of Stary Toruń, next to the Vistula River and entrance to the Timber Port.
