= Górsk =

- Village
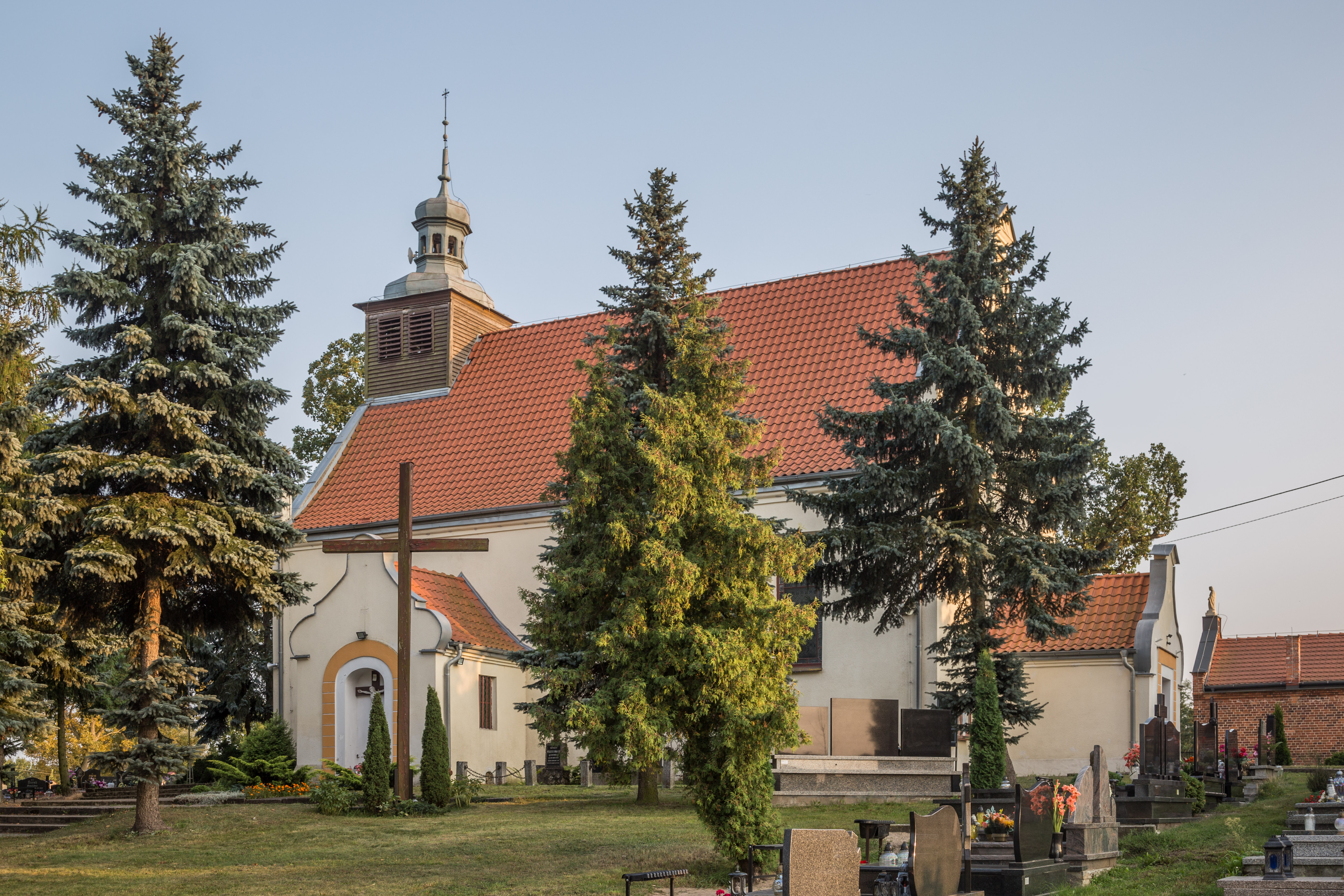
- Parish church of The Holy Cross, 17th century.

- Location within Poland
- Coordinates: 53°3′26″N 18°25′21″E
- Country: Poland
- Voivodeship: Kuyavian-Pomeranian
- County: Toruń
- Gmina: Zławieś Wielka
- Population: 1,500
- Time zone: UTC+1 (CET)
  - Summer (DST): UTC+2 (CEST)
- Vehicle registration: CTR
- Website: http://www.gorsk.pl

Górsk [ɡursk] is a village in the administrative district of Gmina Zławieś Wielka, within Toruń County, Kuyavian-Pomeranian Voivodeship, in north-central Poland. It is located in Chełmno Land within the historic region of Pomerania.

== History ==
During the German occupation of Poland (World War II), Górsk was one of the sites of executions of Poles, carried out by the Germans in 1939 as part of the Intelligenzaktion. In November 1940, the German Schutzpolizei carried out expulsions of Poles, who were placed in a transit camp in nearby Toruń, and then either deported to the General Government in the more eastern part of German-occupied Poland or sent to forced labour, while their houses and farms were handed over to German colonists as part of the Lebensraum policy.

After the war, in 1945, the village was restored to Poland, although with a Soviet-installed communist regime which stayed in power until the Fall of Communism in the 1980s. In 1984, the communist secret police kidnapped priest Jerzy Popiełuszko near Górsk, as he was returning from Bydgoszcz to his parish in Warsaw, and then murdered him in Włocławek. Local Poles repeatedly placed crosses at the site of the kidnapping, which were destroyed by the communists. The current monument in the form of a concrete cross was erected in 2000.

== Culture ==
The main historic landmark of Górsk is the Baroque parish church of the Exaltation of the Holy Cross, built in the 17th century.

There is a Regional Museum (Muzeum Regionalne) and a Youth Educational Centre (Centrum Edukacji Młodzieży) in Górsk.

== Gallery ==
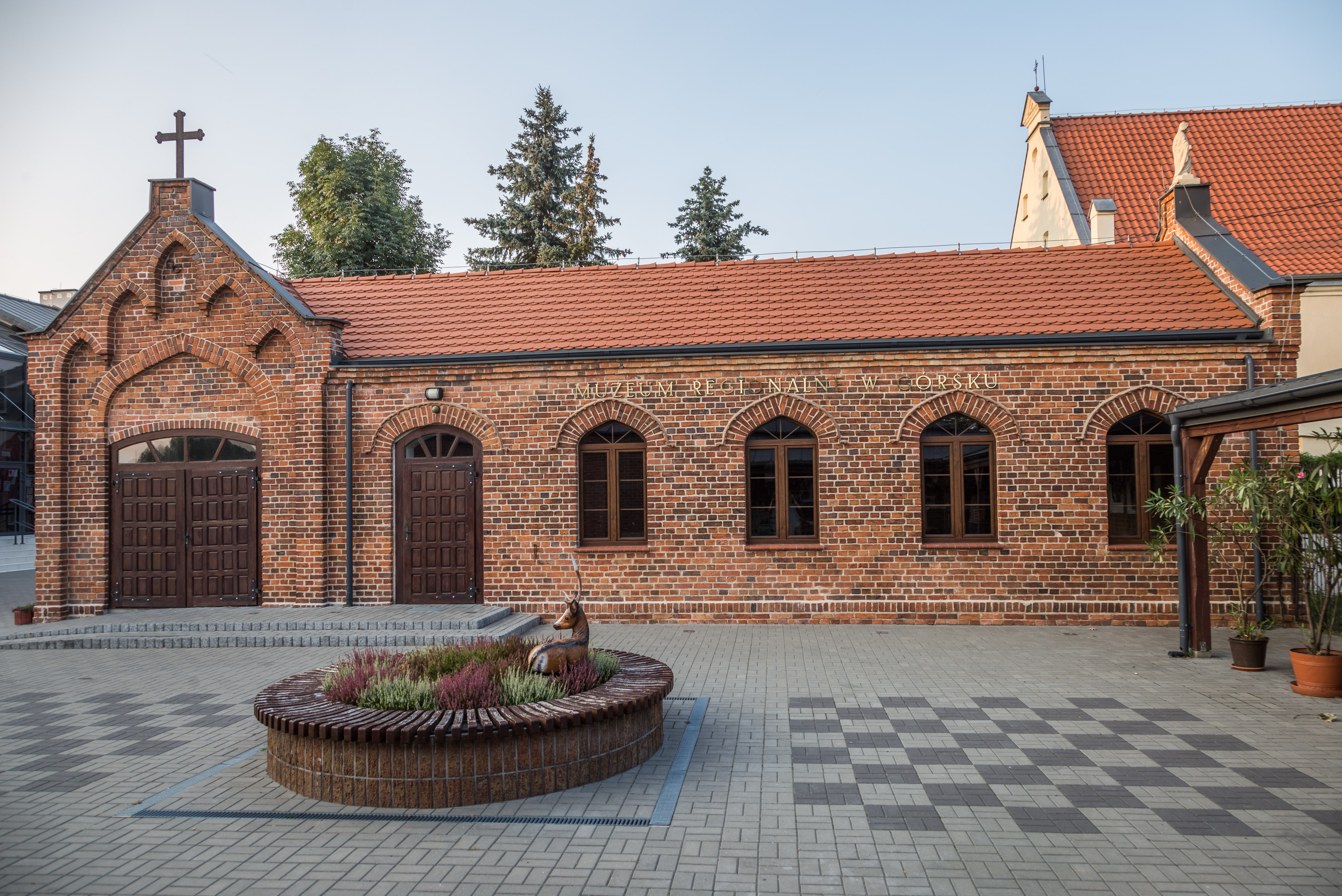
Regional Museum

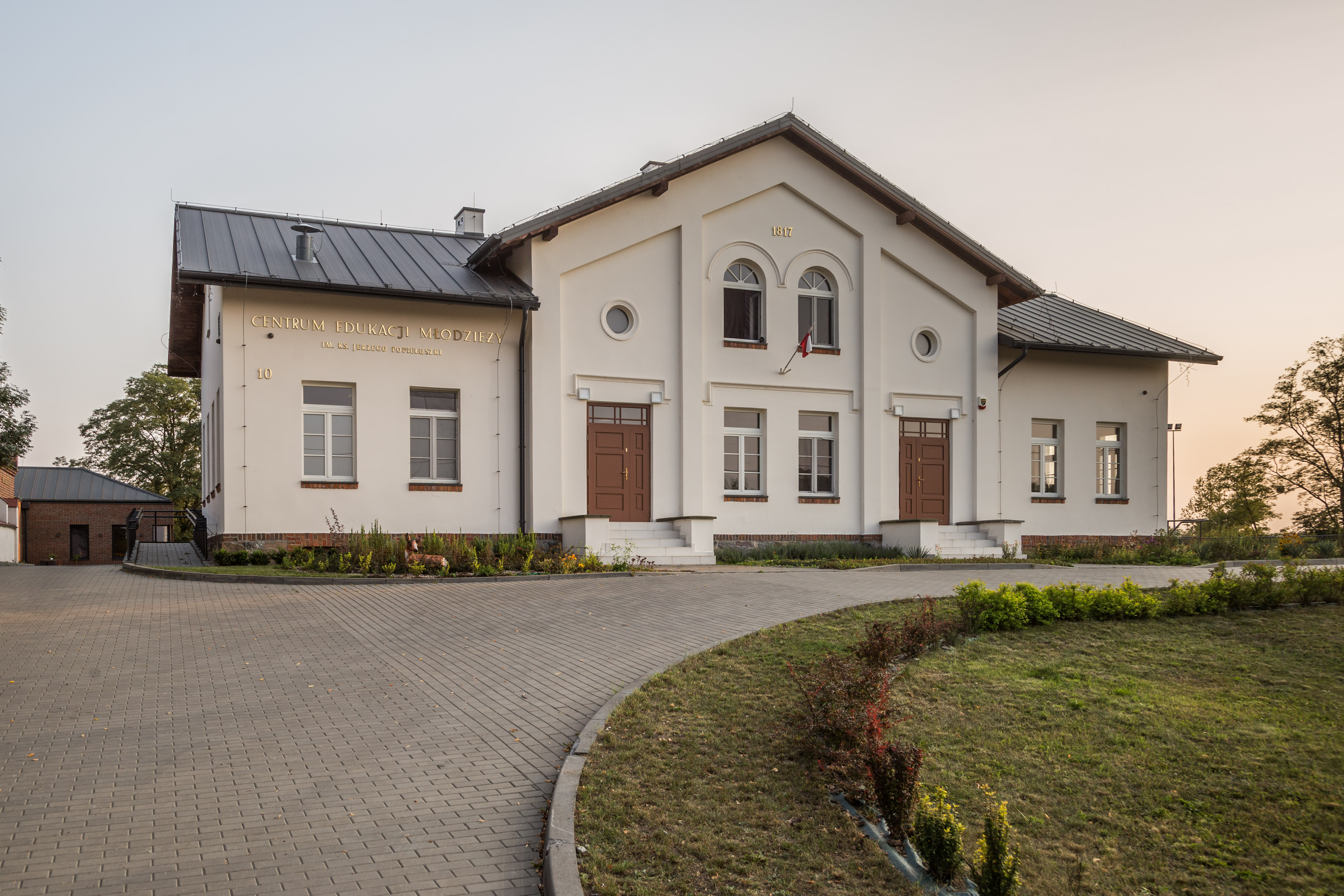
Youth Educational Centre

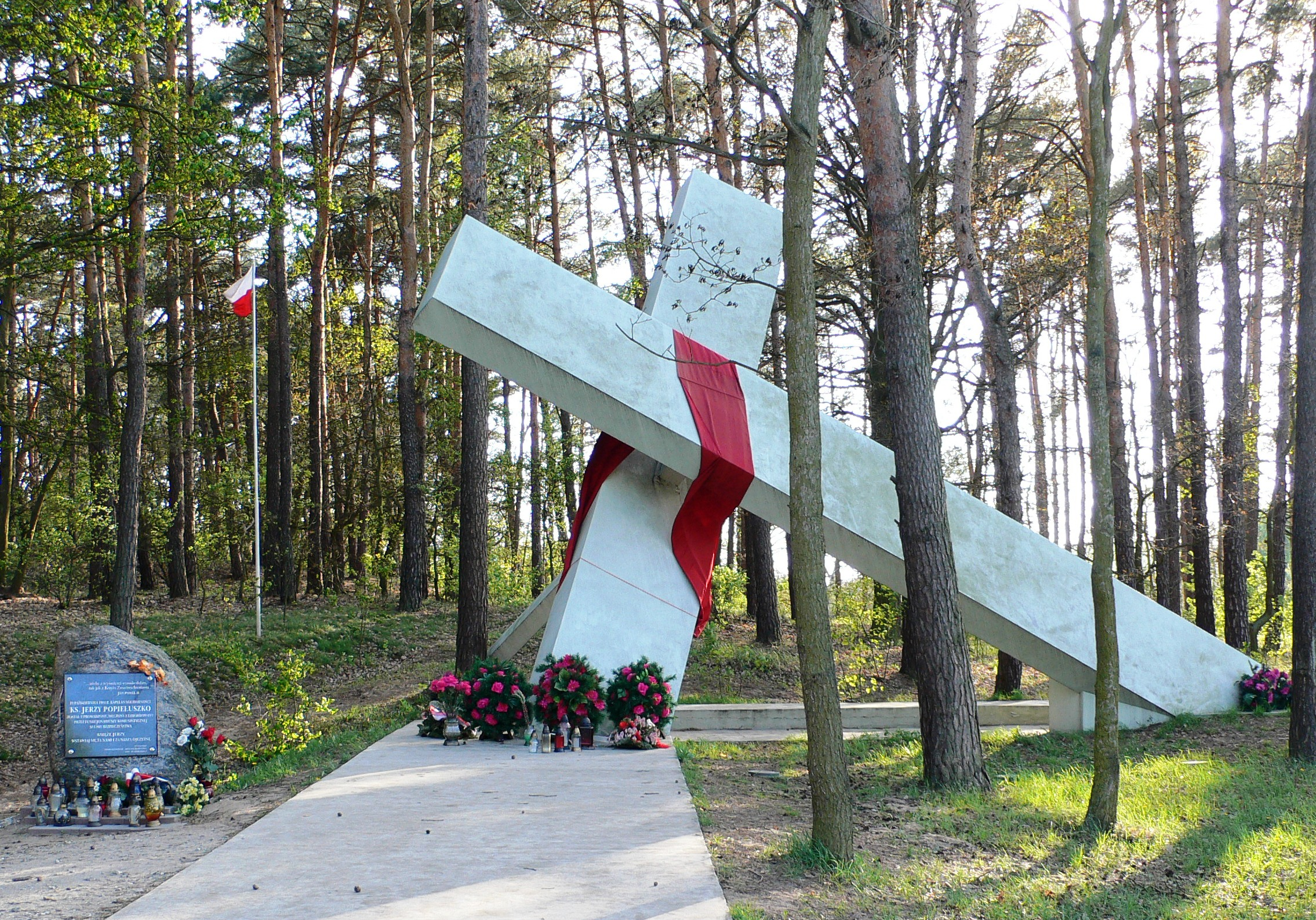
Monument to Jerzy Popiełuszko

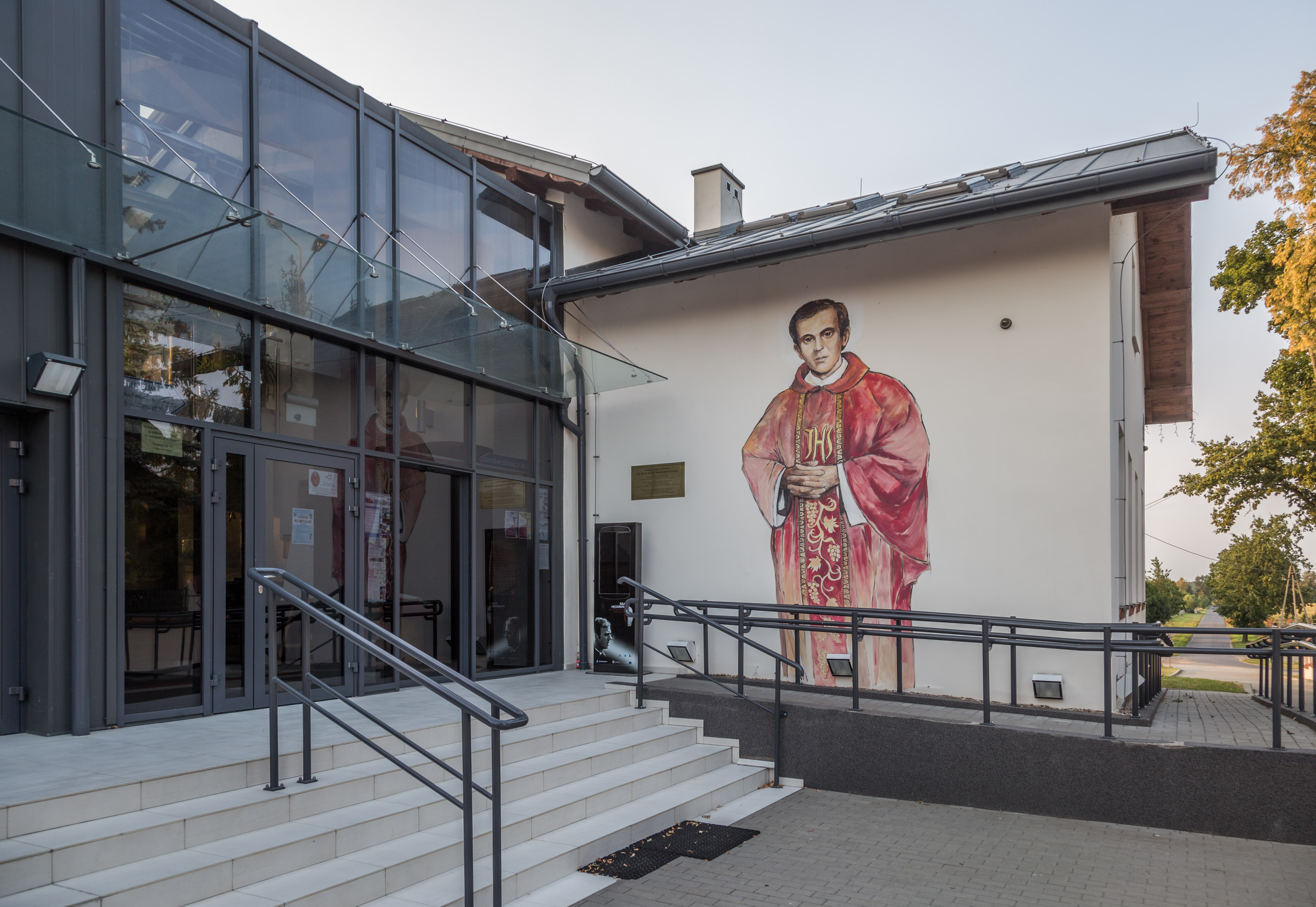
Mural of Jerzy Popiełuszko
