= Museum of Martyrdom of the Blessed Father Jerzy Popiełuszko =

Museum in Włocławek, Poland

Coordinates: 52.6525°N 19.1301°E

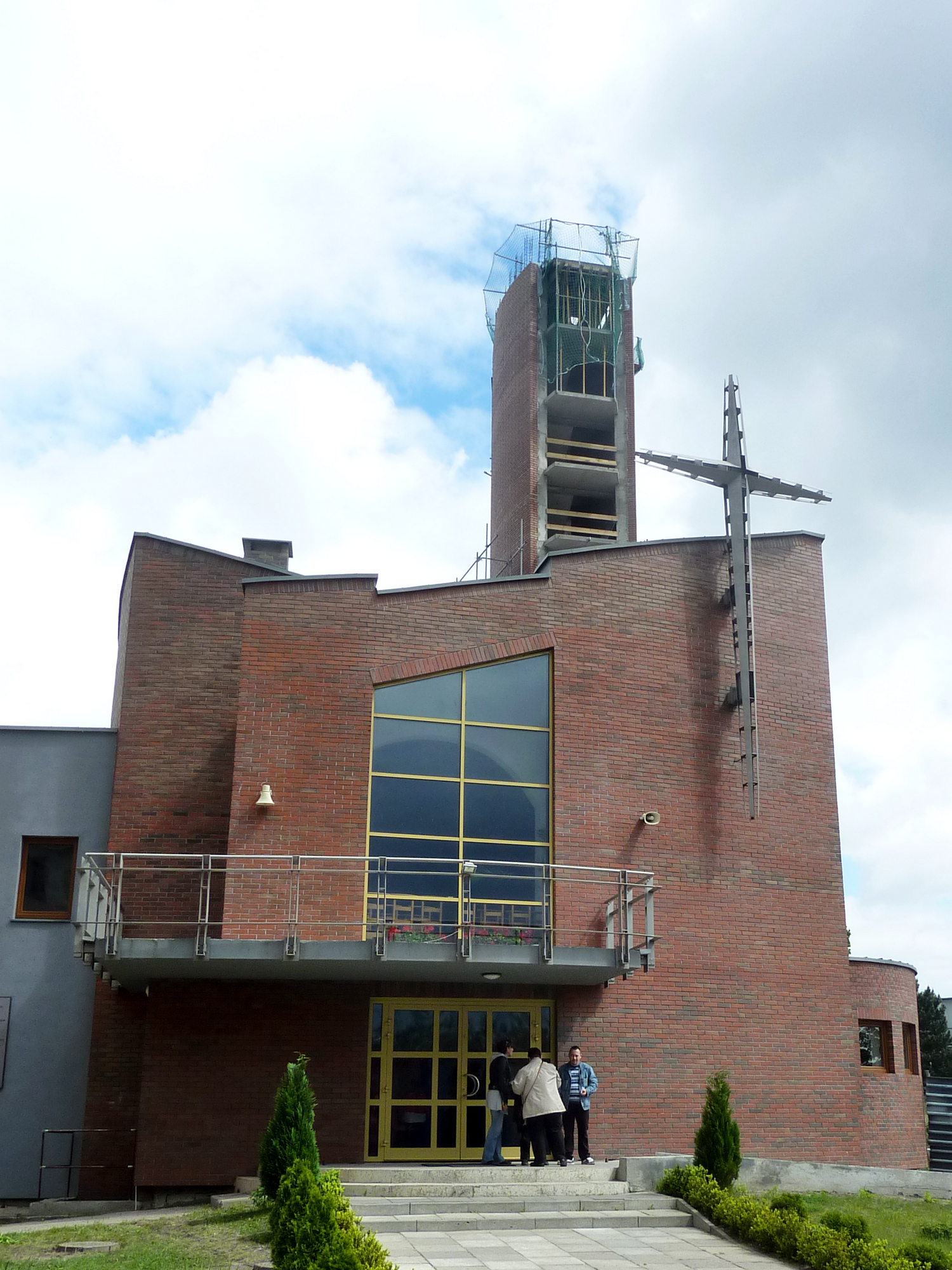
The church, a part of the sanctuary in the basement of which a museum was built

The Museum of Martyrdom of the Blessed Father Jerzy Popiełuszko is a museum commemorating the life, activity and martyrdom of Father Jerzy Popiełuszko.

== Location ==
The museum operates in the basement of the Martyrdom Shrine of the Bl. Fr Jerzy Popiełuszko, which has been under construction for several years, right next to the Włocławek dam, at 167A Płocka Street in Włocławek.

== History ==
On 9 November 1997, a decree of Bishop Bronisław Dembowski came into force, by virtue of which the parish of Our Lady of Fatima was established in Włocławek at Płocka Street. The creation of a new sacral building was entrusted to the Congregation of Brothers of Consolation from Gethsemane. In the plans to build a church and a pastoral centre, it was agreed with the diocesan authorities that the Congregation will attempt to build a parish church with a separate chapel, in which there will be a Sanctuary dedicated to the life and martyrdom of the Blessed.

The museum was established as part of the Kuyavian-Pomeranian project called "The Martyrdom Trail of Blessed Father Jerzy Popiełuszko", with the participation of funds from the Regional Operational Programme of the Kuyavian-Pomeranian Voivodeship. The ceremonial opening of the museum took place five years after the priest's beatification - on June 7, 2015. The care of the Martyrdom Shrine of Blessed Father Jerzy Popiełuszko rests with the Congregation of Brothers of Consolation from Gethsemane, and the museum's custodian is Father Damian M. Kosecki.

== Exhibitions ==
The museum consists of three rooms. The first room presents Fr Jerzy Popiełuszko's childhood and youth, the corridor leads to the "Solidarity" period, while the second room shows the emotions connected with strikes and masses celebrated for the homeland, a period of persecution, harassment and spying on the clergy. The last stage is the story of Father Jerzy's kidnapping and martyrdom.

The first two rooms are a combination of panoramic cinema, television, elements of animation, sound and lights. The screen presents films, reconstructions, fragments of a feature film, stagings with actors, archival materials from Polish newsreels and three-dimensional photographs which are presented by a virtual guide.

The third room is interactive, providing a multimedia map of the world which includes locations associated with Father Jerzy. The room also contacts the museum’s records.

The museum provides information about the priest's life and activity, as well as a description of the cult of the "Solidarity" chaplain after his martyrdom.

== See also ==
- Memorial Room of Father Jerzy Popiełuszko in Suchowola
- Monument commemorating the kidnapping and assassination of Father Popiełuszko
