= Toruń County =

Toruń County Powiat toruński
- County
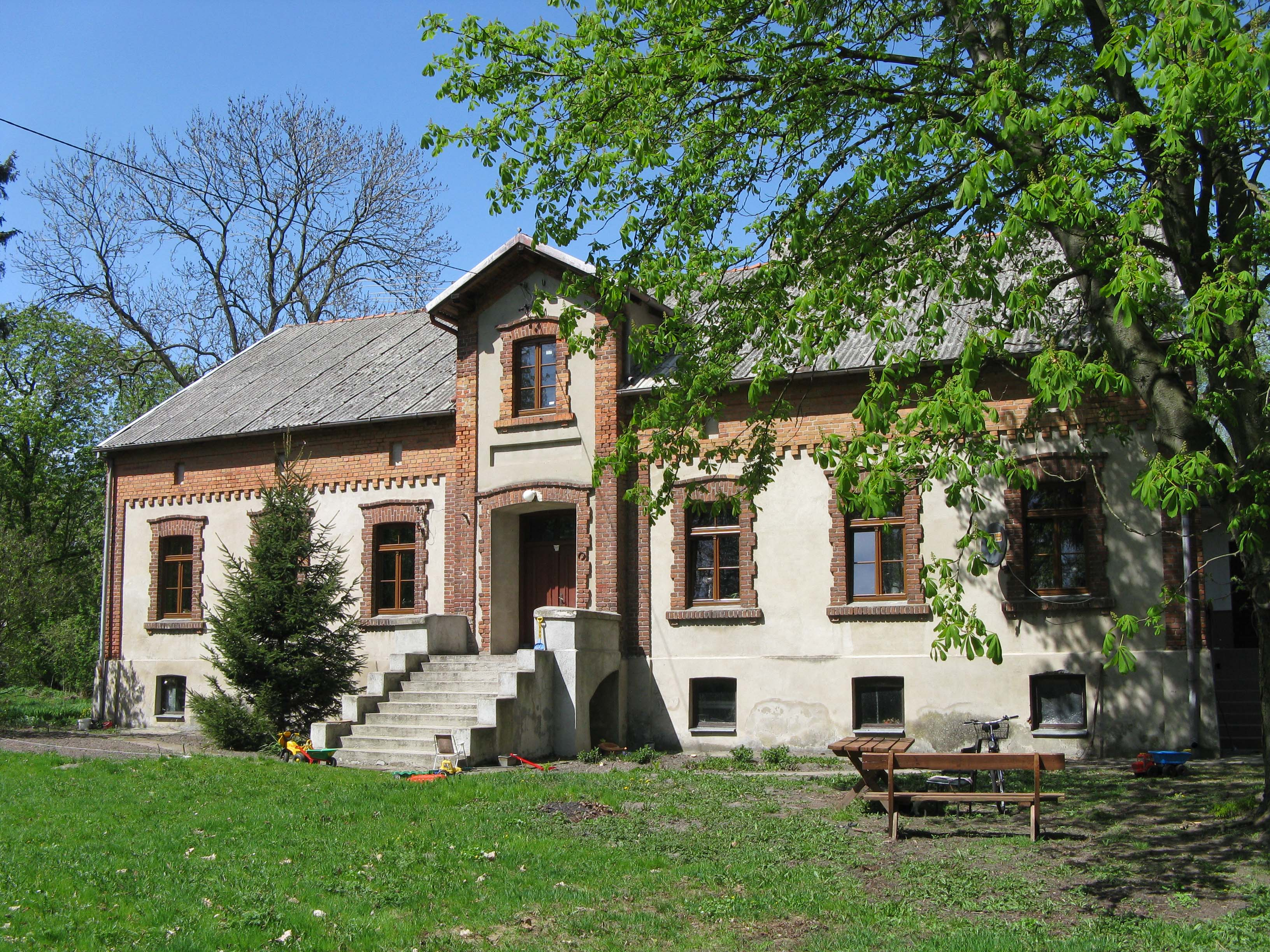

- Flag Coat of arms

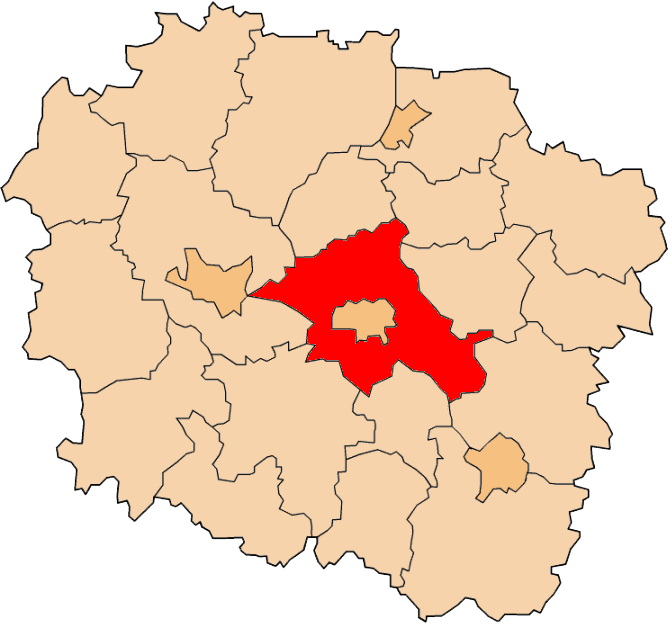
- Location within the voivodeship
- Coordinates (Toruń): 53°2′N 18°37′E
- Country: Poland
- Voivodeship: Kuyavian-Pomeranian
- Seat: Toruń
- Gminas: Total 9 (incl. 1 urban): Chełmża; Gmina Chełmża; Gmina Czernikowo; Gmina Łubianka; Gmina Lubicz; Gmina Łysomice; Gmina Obrowo; Gmina Wielka Nieszawka; Gmina Zławieś Wielka

Area
  - Total: 1,229.71 km^{2} (474.79 sq mi)

Population (2019)
  - Total: 107,641
  - Density: 87.5336/km^{2} (226.711/sq mi)
  - Urban: 14,503
  - Rural: 93,138
- Car plates: CTR
- Website: www.powiattorunski.pl

Toruń County (Polish: powiat toruński) is a unit of territorial administration and local government (powiat) in Kuyavian-Pomeranian Voivodeship, north-central Poland. It was created on January 1, 1999, as a result of the Polish local government reforms passed in 1998. Its administrative seat is the city of Toruń, although the city is not part of the county (it constitutes a separate city county). The only town in Toruń County is Chełmża, which lies nineteen kilometers (twelve miles) north of Toruń.

The county covers an area of 1,229.71 square kilometres (474.8 sq mi). As of 2019 its total population is 107,641, out of which the population of Chełmża is 14,503 and the rural population is 93,138.

== Neighboring counties ==
Apart from the city of Toruń, Toruń County is also bordered by Chełmno County to the north, Wąbrzeźno County to the north-east, Golub-Dobrzyń County and Lipno County to the east, Aleksandrów County to the south, Inowrocław County to the south-west, and the city of Bydgoszcz and Bydgoszcz County to the west.

== Administrative divisions ==
The county is subdivided into nine gminas (one urban and eight rural). These are listed in the following table, in descending order of population.

Gmina	Type	Area (km^{2})	Population (2019)	Seat
Gmina Lubicz	rural	106.0	20,004	Lubicz
Gmina Obrowo	rural	162.0	17,486	Obrowo
Chełmża	urban	7.8	14,503	
Gmina Zławieś Wielka	rural	177.5	14,246	Zławieś Wielka
Gmina Łysomice	rural	127.3	10,098	Łysomice
Gmina Chełmża	rural	178.7	9,818	Chełmża *
Gmina Czernikowo	rural	169.4	9,081	Czernikowo
Gmina Łubianka	rural	84.6	7,186	Łubianka
Gmina Wielka Nieszawka	rural	216.3	5,219	Wielka Nieszawka
* seat not part of the gmina
