= Wanda Modlibowska =

Wanda Modliwbowska
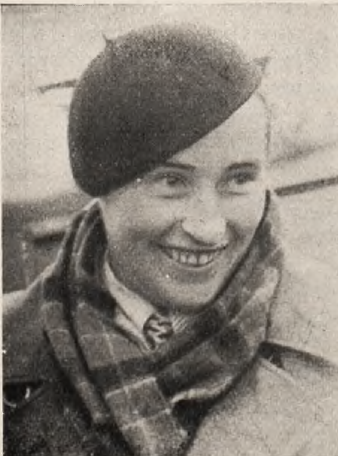
- Born: 19 November 1909; Czachorowo, Greater Poland Voivodeship, Poland
- Died: 11 July 2001 (aged 91); Łężeczki, Poland
- Known for: Pioneering research on aviation, cryptography
- Awards: Cross of Valour (Poland); Cross of Merit (Poland); Warsaw Uprising Cross
- Scientific career
- Fields: Aviation acoustics

Wanda Modlibowska (11 November 1909 - 11 July 2001), outstanding Polish pilot, emissary, underground activist and cryptographer. On her shoulders rest the organization of the work and communications of a Government Delegate for Poland.

== Life and career ==
She was born on 19 November 1909, in her family estate Czachorowo near Gostyn. She graduated from the Queen Jadwiga Gymnasium for the Humanities in Poznań, where she passed her matriculation exam in 1929. She continued her education at the Faculty of Chemistry of the University of Poznan, receiving a master's degree in inorganic chemistry. As a young girl, she played many sports (skiing, rowing, mountain climbing), but her real passion turned out to be aviation.

In 1930 she joined the Poznań Aeroclub, where, under the tutelage of instructor Edmund Holodyński, she earned a pilot's license in a Hanriot H.28 airplane. Three years later she completed another course, this time in glider piloting, to take part in national glider competitions. For setting several records, which included the distance flown (343 kilometers) and the duration of the flight (24 hours and 14 minutes), she received the Silver Cross of Merit and was the first Polish woman to receive the FAI Silver Gliding Badge. "This time the main driving force behind my decision and my perseverance was the desire to spice up my colleagues, so hard, that they would remember that a woman can do something, too." - she reported after breaking the record for the length of a glider flight.

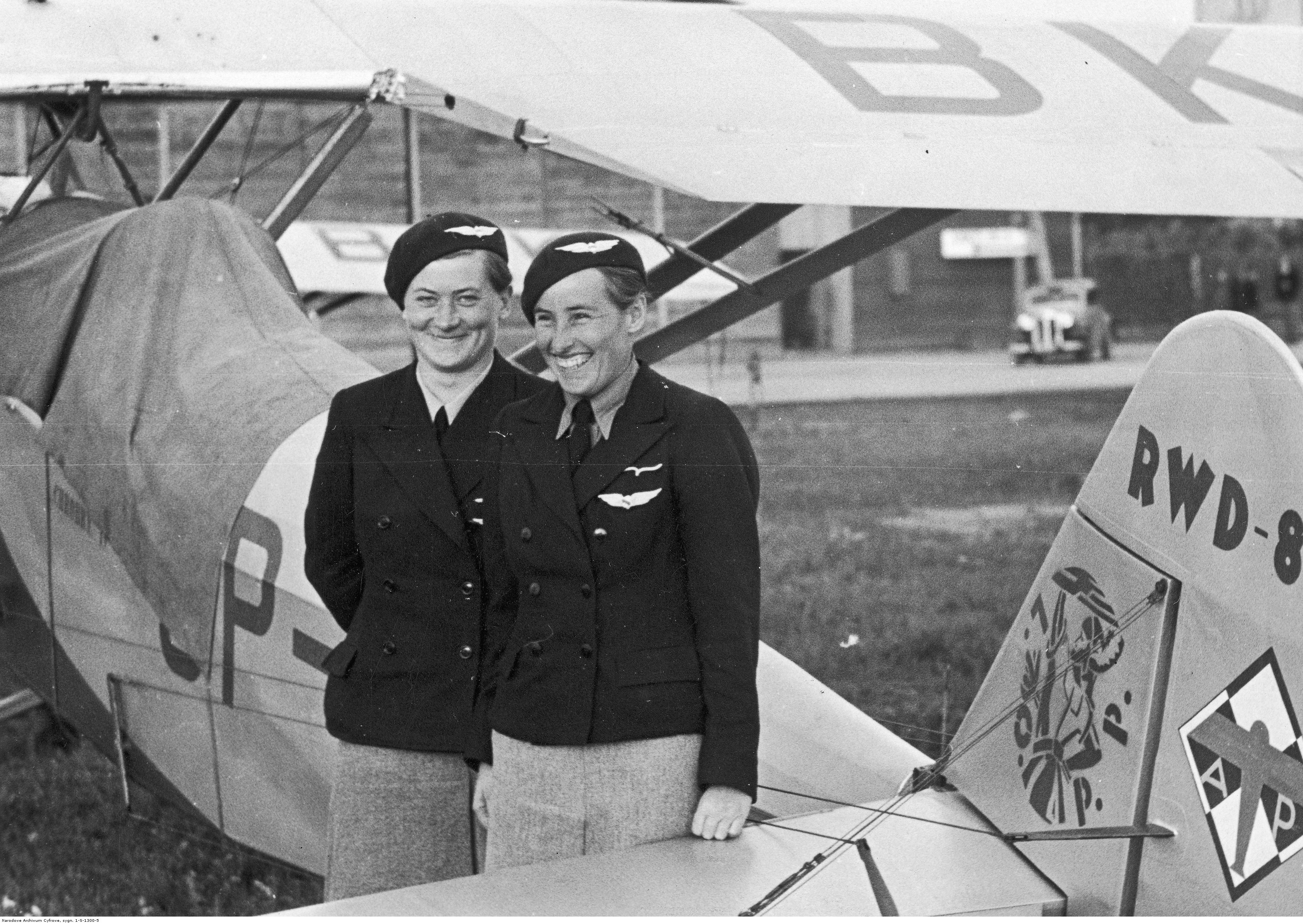
Wanda Modlibowska (at right) and Ewa Korczyńska next to the RWD-8 plane, Warsaw 1938

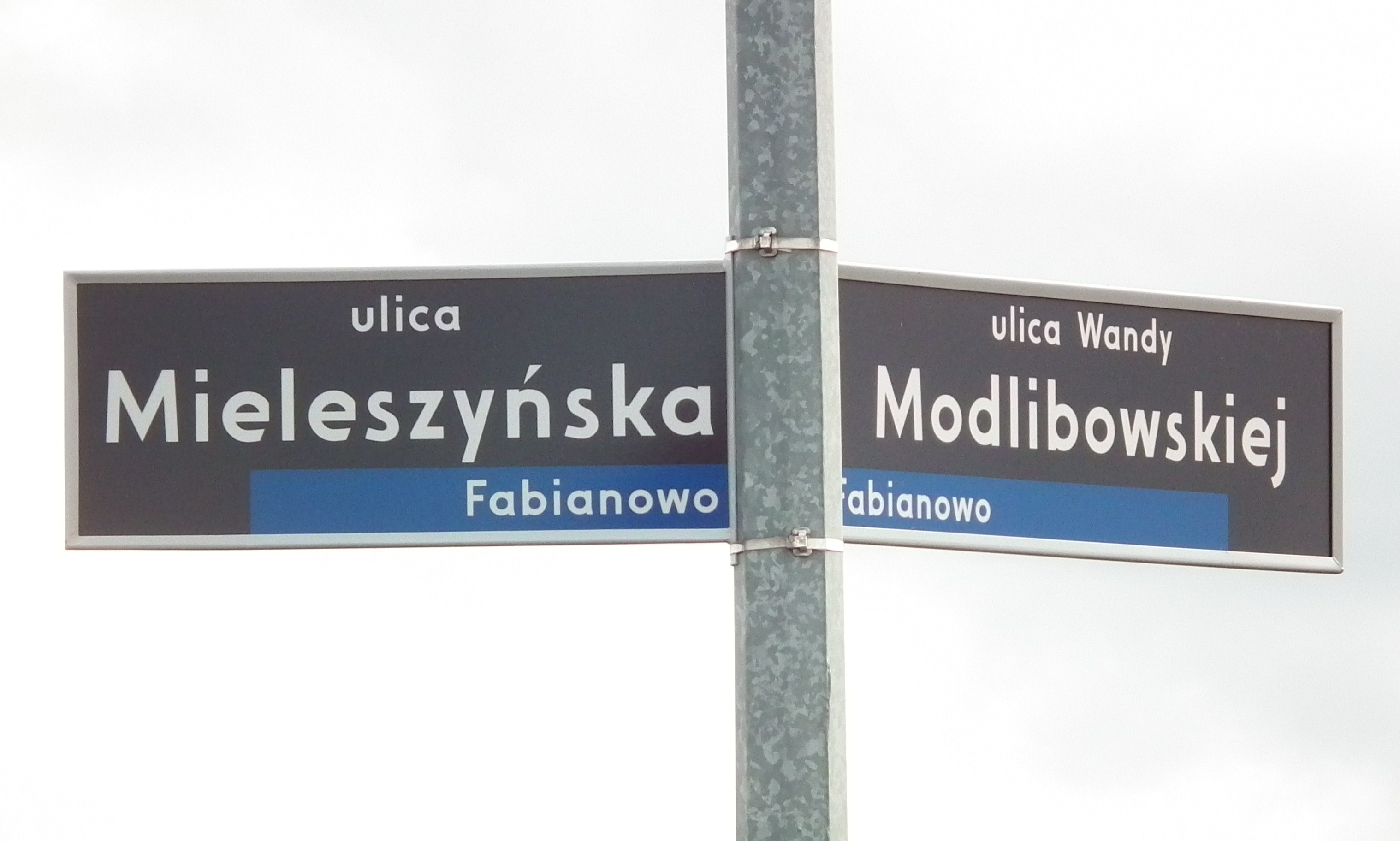
Poznań, Fabianowo, Modlibowska Street

Even before the outbreak of World War II, she was mobilized as a liaison pilot to the Liaison Squadron of the General Staff of the Polish Army in Warsaw.

After the September campaign, as a second lieutenant wartime pilot, she was called to work at the Air and Air Defense Command in Paris. At the behest of General Sikorski, she received special training for cryptology and became the first emissary sent from France to Poland as part of the Delegation of the Delegation of the Government of the Republic of Poland at Home.

In 1941, Modlibowska took charge of the Delegation's cryptographer cell, whose task was to maintain constant contact with the Polish authorities in exile, deliver documents and organize underground spaces. The Presidium Bureau, located in Modlibowka's apartment at 10 Lwowska Street, consisted of the following cells: internal communications, radio, cipher, as well as the nationality desk and the secretariat.

She drove couriers out, relaying passwords and encrypted message to the "W" post. While carrying out a courier mission in 1944, as a soldier in the Home Army, she took an active part in the Warsaw Uprising.

For her underground activities, she was arrested by the NKVD, was brutally interrogated and then exiled to logging work in the Urals. After her release from exile, she returned to the country to participate in the reactivation of the Poznań Aero Club and to work as a test pilot at the Gliding Institute.

During a political verification conducted at the behest of the state authorities in 1948, the Department of Security stripped her of her pilot's license and banned her from the airport, and eventually threw her to prison for 18 months. After her release, she continued to be under regular surveillance and had trouble finding work. During the October thaw in 1956, she joined the Warsaw Senior Aviation Club, which allowed her to visit other aeroclubs.

Due to her health, she moved from Warsaw to the Nursing Home in Łężeczki near Pniewy, where she died on July 11,2001. For her merits and independence activities, she was awarded the Insurgent Cross, the Cross of Valor and the medal "Meritorious for Aviation".

"Let the world know that there is a country called Poland, beloved Poland" - this motto guided almost all her life activities.
