= Kłosowice =

Kłosowice may refer to:

- Kłosowice, Greater Poland Voivodeship
- Kłosowice, West Pomeranian Voivodeship
