= Gospódka =

- Village
- Location within Poland
- Coordinates: 52°44′33″N 15°59′17″E
- Country: Poland
- Voivodeship: Greater Poland
- County: Międzychód
- Gmina: Sieraków

Gospódka [ɡɔsˈputka] is a village in the administrative district of Gmina Sieraków, within Międzychód County, Greater Poland Voivodeship, in west-central Poland.
