= Śrem, Międzychód County =

Śrem
- Village
- Location within Poland
- Coordinates: 52°36′15″N 16°3′35″E
- Country: Poland
- Voivodeship: Greater Poland
- County: Międzychód
- Gmina: Sieraków
- Population: 20

Śrem [ɕrɛm] is a village in the administrative district of Gmina Sieraków, within Międzychód County, Greater Poland Voivodeship, in west-central Poland.
