= Chojna, Międzychód County =

Settlement in Gmina Międzychód, Poland

Chojna
- Settlement
- Country: Poland
- Voivodeship: Greater Poland
- County: Międzychód
- Gmina: Międzychód

Chojna [ˈxɔi̯na] is a settlement in the administrative district of Gmina Międzychód, within Międzychód County, Greater Poland Voivodeship, in west-central Poland.
