= Drzewce, Międzychód County =

Drzewce
- Village
- Location within Poland
- Coordinates: 52°38′53″N 15°49′18″E
- Country: Poland
- Voivodeship: Greater Poland
- County: Międzychód
- Gmina: Międzychód
- Population: 80

Drzewce [ˈdʐɛft͡sɛ] is a village in the administrative district of Gmina Międzychód, within Międzychód County, Greater Poland Voivodeship, in west-central Poland.
