= Tuchola, Greater Poland Voivodeship =

Tuchola
- Village
- Location within Poland
- Coordinates: 52°41′N 16°8′E
- Country: Poland
- Voivodeship: Greater Poland
- County: Międzychód
- Gmina: Sieraków

Tuchola [tuˈxɔla] is a village in the administrative district of Gmina Sieraków, within Międzychód County, Greater Poland Voivodeship, in west-central Poland.
