= Lewice, Greater Poland Voivodeship =

Lewice
- Village
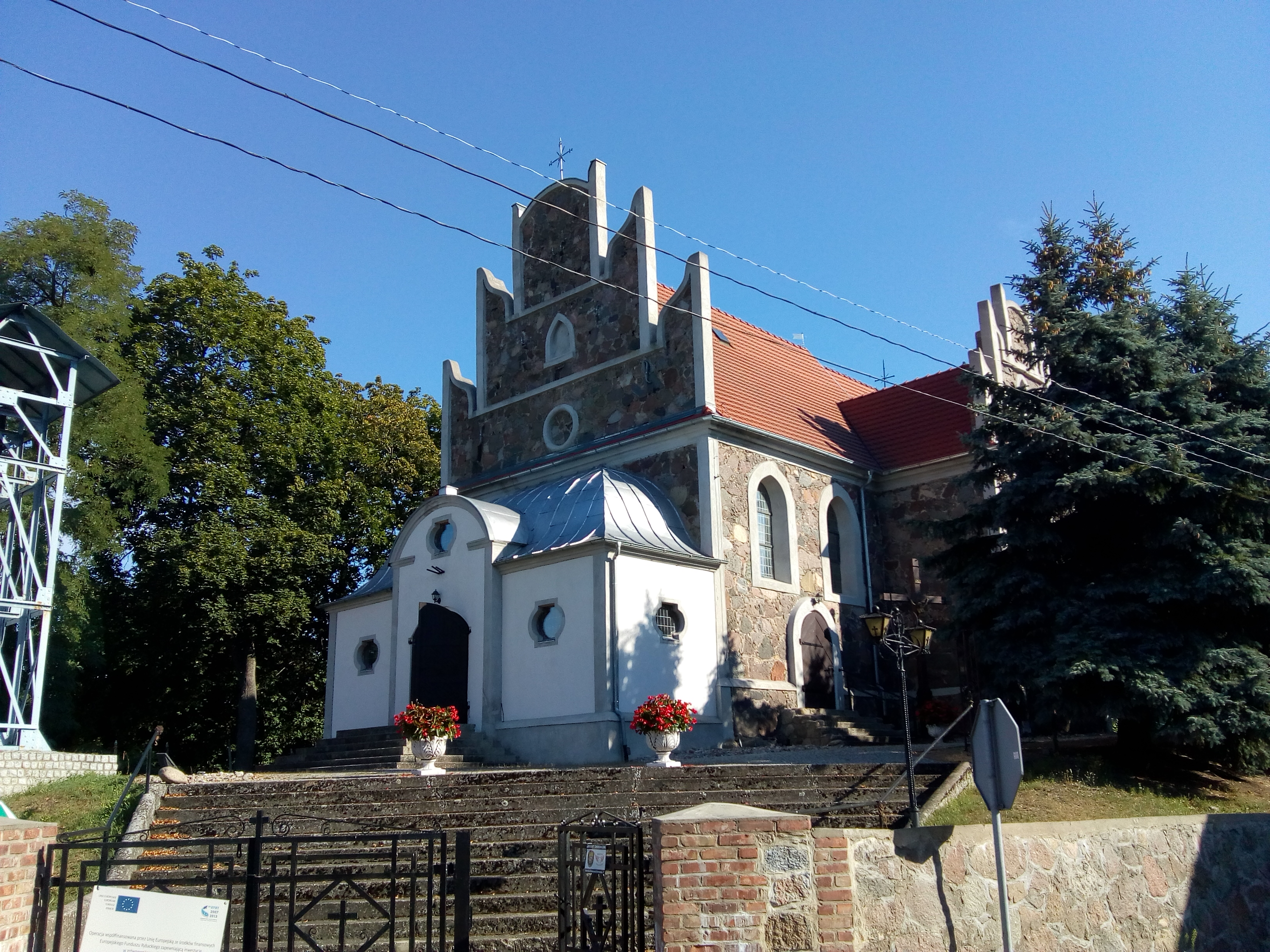

- Location within Poland
- Coordinates: 52°31′55″N 15°55′17″E
- Country: Poland
- Voivodeship: Greater Poland
- County: Międzychód
- Gmina: Międzychód

Lewice [lɛˈvit͡sɛ] is a village in the administrative district of Gmina Międzychód, within Międzychód County, Greater Poland Voivodeship, in west-central Poland.
