= Karl Nobiling =

Attempted assassin of German Emperor Wilhelm I

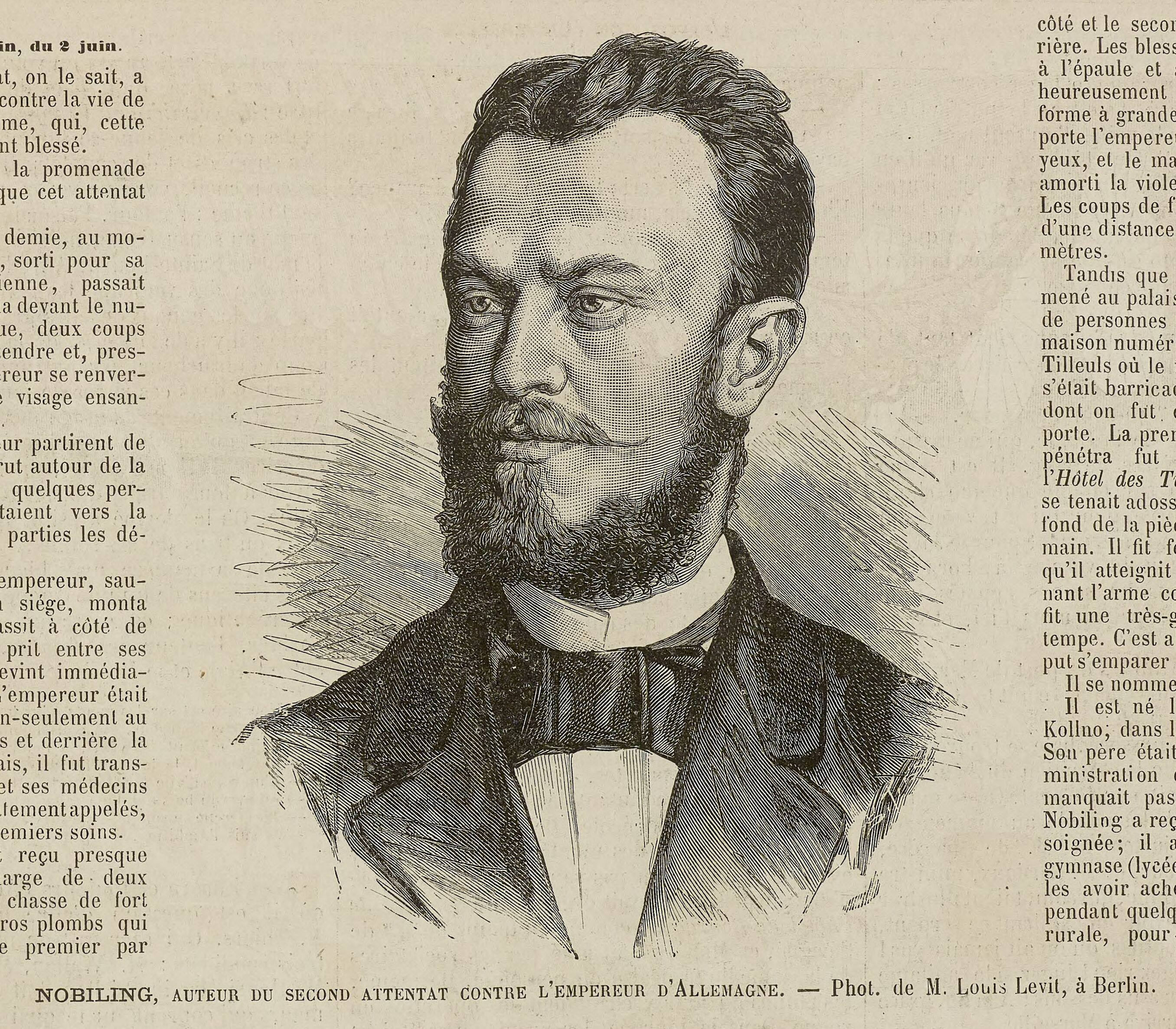
- Portrait of Nobiling in L'Illustration, June 1878
- Born: Karl Eduard Nobiling; April 10, 1848; Kulm, Grand Duchy of Posen, Kingdom of Prussia
- Died: September 10, 1878 (aged 30); Berlin, German Empire
- Cause of death: Suicide by gunshot
- Other name: Pétroleur
- Occupation: Agronomist
- Parents: Hans Eduard August Nobiling (father); Amalie Auguste Friederike Johanna née Viebig (mother)

Academic background
- Education: Leipzig University
- Thesis: Beiträge zur Geschichte der Landwirthschaft des Saalkreises der Provinz Sachsen (1876)

Academic work
- Discipline: History
- Sub-discipline: Economic and agricultural history

Karl Eduard Nobiling (10 April 1848 – 10 September 1878) was a German attempted assassin, who in 1878 made an attempt on the life of Emperor Wilhelm I.

== Biography ==
Nobiling was born in Kulm, Kreis Birnbaum in the Prussian region of Posen, where his father was the tenant of the local manor. He attended school in Züllichau and studied political science and agriculture at the University of Halle and Leipzig University, where he received a doctor's degree in 1876. During his studenthood he may have had some minor contact with Socialist circles, though an affiliation with the contemporary social democratic movement has not been conclusively established.

== Assassination attempt ==
Nobiling moved to Berlin where, on the afternoon of 2 June 1878, he shot and wounded Kaiser Wilhelm I from the window of his apartment on the Unter den Linden boulevard. He used a double-barrelled shotgun and numerous pellets hit the body of the emperor, though the life of the 81-year-old was saved by his Pickelhaube helmet. When, immediately after the failed assassination attempt, several witnesses tried to disarm him, Nobiling shot himself in the head with a revolver. Not fit to be questioned, he soon fell senseless and finally succumbed to his injuries in September 1878. His attempt to murder Wilhelm came less than one month after a similar attempt by Max Hödel.

=== Aftermath ===
Chancellor Otto von Bismarck used the actions of Nobiling and Hödel as justification to implement the Anti-Socialist Law in October 1878.

Following his death, Nobiling's family successfully petitioned the Kaiser to change their surname to Edeling in order to dissociate themselves from the assassination attempt.

== Literature ==
- Vizetelly, Ernest A.: The Anarchists: Their Faith and Their Record. Edinburgh 1911 (ausführliche Beschreibung des Tathergangs in Kapitel 3).
- Kellerhoff, Sven Felix: Attentäter. Wahnsinnige, Verführte, Kriminelle. Arean, Erftstadt 2005 ISBN 3-89996-344-X, S. 31 ff.
- Mühlnikel, Marcus: Fürst, sind Sie unverletzt?' Attentate im Kaiserreich 1871–1914. Schöningh, Paderborn 2014 ISBN 978-3-506-77860-4
