= Góra, Międzychód County =

Góra
- Village
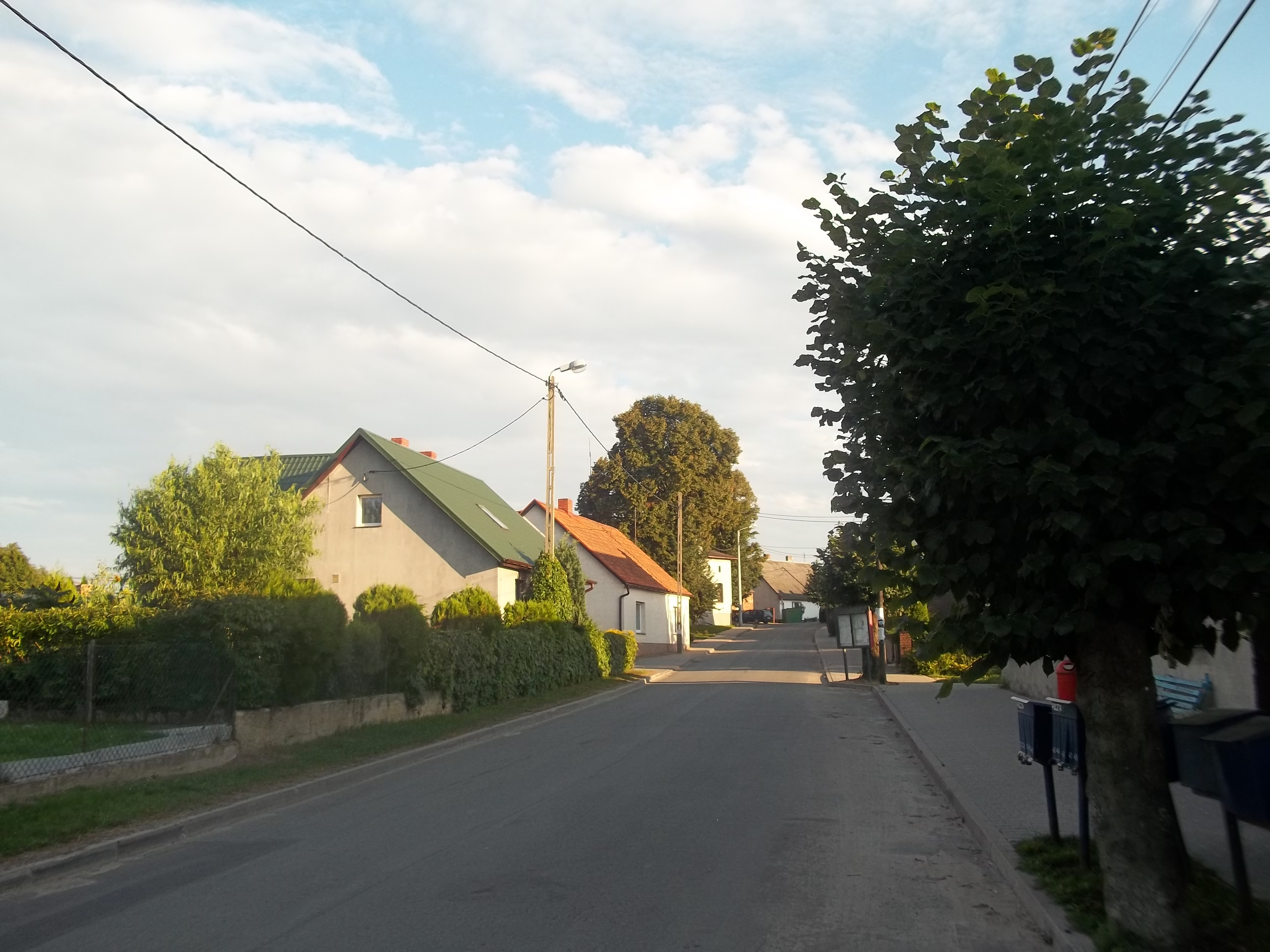
- A road in Góra

- Location within Poland
- Coordinates: 52°37′22″N 16°4′28″E
- Country: Poland
- Voivodeship: Greater Poland
- County: Międzychód
- Gmina: Sieraków

Population
  - Total: 192
- Time zone: UTC+1 (CET)
  - Summer (DST): UTC+2 (CEST)

Góra [ˈɡura] is a village in the administrative district of Gmina Sieraków, within Międzychód County, Greater Poland Voivodeship, in west-central Poland.
