= Radusz, Greater Poland Voivodeship =

Radusz
- Settlement
- Location within Poland
- Coordinates: 52°40′N 15°56′E
- Country: Poland
- Voivodeship: Greater Poland
- County: Międzychód
- Gmina: Międzychód

Radusz [ˈraduʂ] is a settlement in the administrative district of Gmina Międzychód, within Międzychód County, Greater Poland Voivodeship, in west-central Poland.
