= Kaplin, Greater Poland Voivodeship =

Kaplin
- Village
- Location within Poland
- Coordinates: 52°39′6″N 15°53′10″E
- Country: Poland
- Voivodeship: Greater Poland
- County: Międzychód
- Gmina: Międzychód
- Population: 110

Kaplin [ˈkaplin] is a village in the administrative district of Gmina Międzychód, within Międzychód County, Greater Poland Voivodeship, in west-central Poland.
