= Dormowo =

- Village
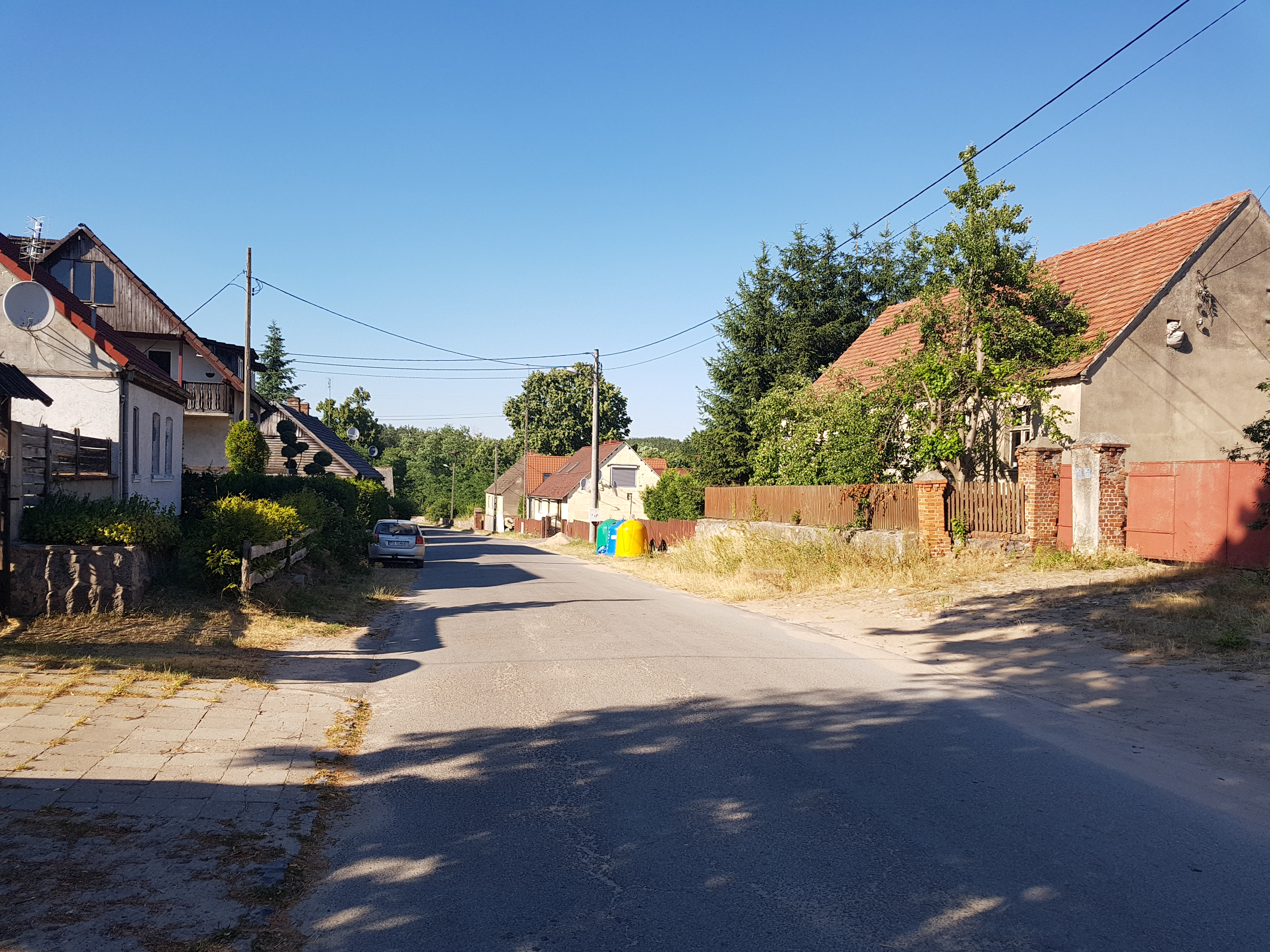

- Location within Poland
- Coordinates: 52°32′N 15°53′E
- Country: Poland
- Voivodeship: Greater Poland
- County: Międzychód
- Gmina: Międzychód
- Time zone: UTC+1 (CET)
  - Summer (DST): UTC+2 (CEST)
- Vehicle registration: PMI

Dormowo [dɔrˈmɔvɔ] is a village in the administrative district of Gmina Międzychód, within Międzychód County, Greater Poland Voivodeship, in western Poland.

Dormowo was a private church village, administratively located in the Poznań County in the Poznań Voivodeship in the Greater Poland Province of the Kingdom of Poland.
