= Bucharzewo =

- Village
- Location within Poland
- Coordinates: 52°41′N 16°7′E
- Country: Poland
- Voivodeship: Greater Poland
- County: Międzychód
- Gmina: Sieraków

Bucharzewo [buxaˈʐɛvɔ] is a village in the administrative district of Gmina Sieraków, within Międzychód County, Greater Poland Voivodeship, in west-central Poland.
