= Lutom, Greater Poland Voivodeship =

Lutom
- Village
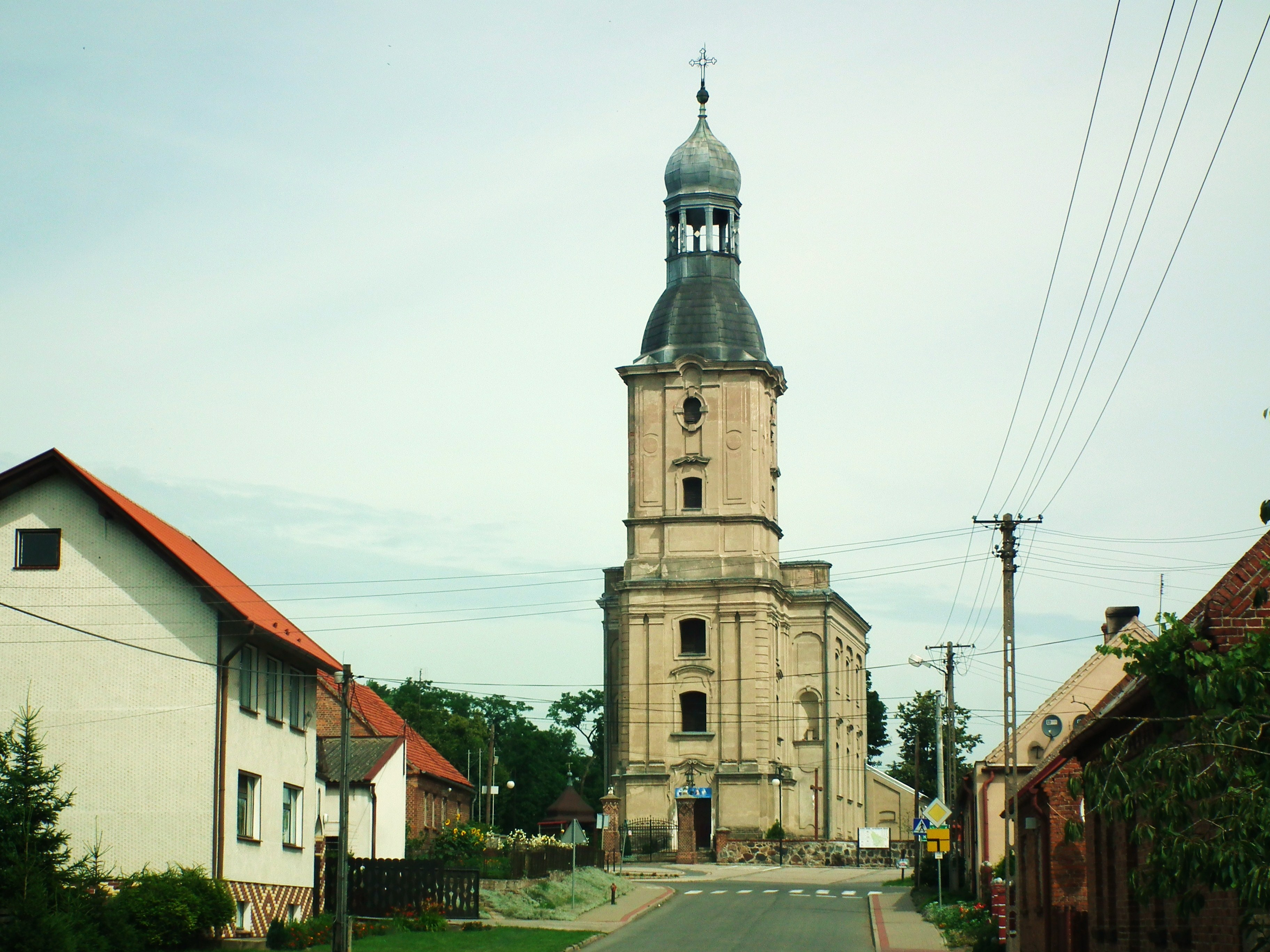
- Church of Saint Andrew the Apostle and Our Lady Help of Christians

- Location within Poland
- Coordinates: 52°38′N 16°9′E
- Country: Poland
- Voivodeship: Greater Poland
- County: Międzychód
- Gmina: Sieraków

Population
  - Total: 522

Lutom [ˈlutɔm] is a village in the administrative district of Gmina Sieraków, within Międzychód County, Greater Poland Voivodeship, in west-central Poland.
