= Żmijowiec, Greater Poland Voivodeship =

Żmijowiec
- Settlement
- Location within Poland
- Coordinates: 52°39′32″N 15°51′08″E
- Country: Poland
- Voivodeship: Greater Poland
- County: Międzychód
- Gmina: Międzychód

Żmijowiec [ʐmiˈjɔvjɛt͡s] is a settlement in the administrative district of Gmina Międzychód, within Międzychód County, Greater Poland Voivodeship, in west-central Poland.
