= Łężce, Greater Poland Voivodeship =

Łężce
- Village
- Location within Poland
- Coordinates: 52°36′N 16°12′E
- Country: Poland
- Voivodeship: Greater Poland
- County: Międzychód
- Gmina: Chrzypsko Wielkie

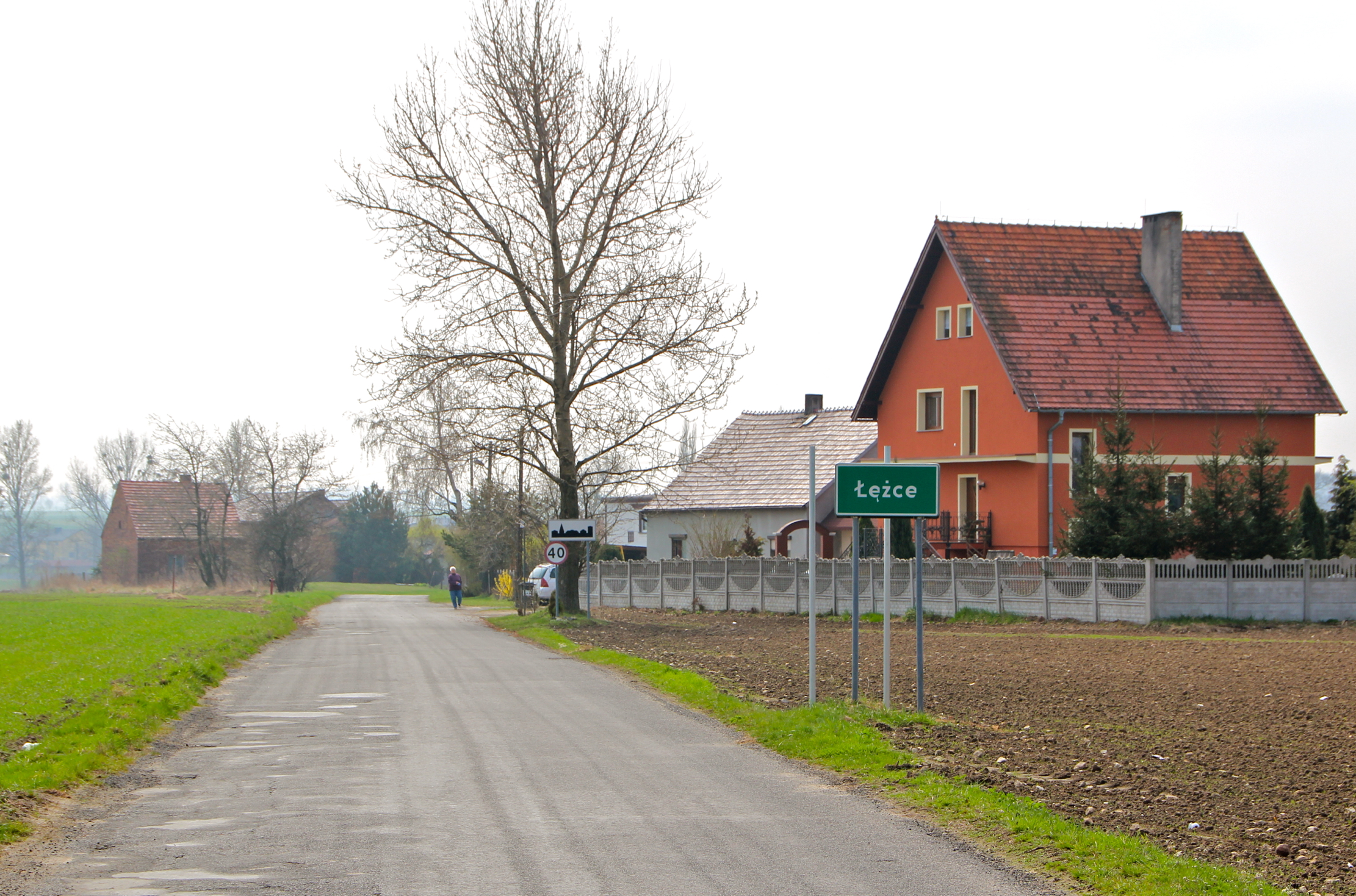
Łężce

Łężce [ˈwɛ̃ʂt͡sɛ] is a village in the administrative district of Gmina Chrzypsko Wielkie, within Międzychód County, Greater Poland Voivodeship, in west-central Poland.
