= Mniszki, Greater Poland Voivodeship =

Mniszki
- Village
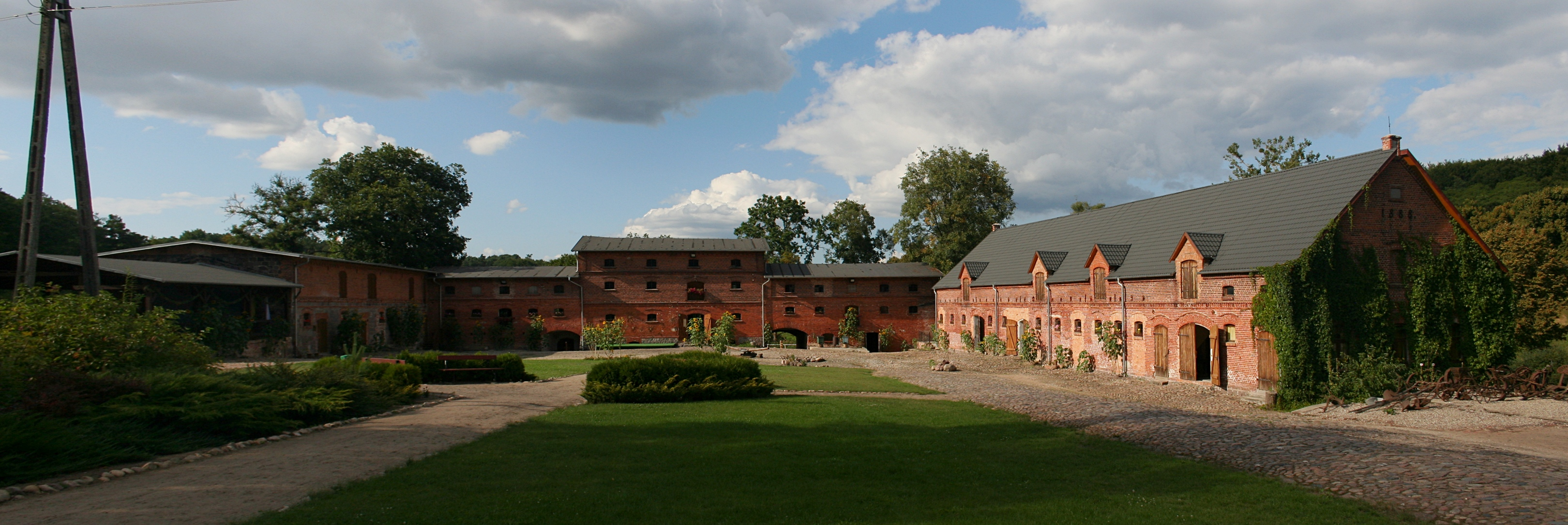
- Cultural heritage monument in Mniszki

- Location within Poland
- Coordinates: 52°32′08″N 15°59′01″E
- Country: Poland
- Voivodeship: Greater Poland
- County: Międzychód
- Gmina: Międzychód
- Website: http://www.mniszki.pl/

Mniszki [ˈmniʂki] is a village in the administrative district of Gmina Międzychód, within Międzychód County, Greater Poland Voivodeship, in west-central Poland.
