= Śródka =

Śródka may refer to the following places:

- Śródka, Poznań, a historic district in the city of Poznań
- Śródka, Poznań County, a village 18 km south-east of Poznań
- Śródka, Międzychód County, a village 52 km north-west of Poznań
- Śródka, Warmian-Masurian Voivodeship, a village in northern Poland
