= Błota =

Błota may refer to:

- Błota, Sieradz County
- Błota, Kutno County
- Spreewald - Błota in Sorbian
- Błota, Greater Poland Voivodeship (west-central Poland)
- Błota, Opole Voivodeship (south-west Poland)
