= Lichwin =

Lichwin may refer to:

- Lichwin, Lesser Poland Voivodeship
- Lichwin, Greater Poland Voivodeship
