= Białcz, Greater Poland Voivodeship =

Białcz
- Village
- Location within Poland
- Coordinates: 52°37′29″N 16°11′39″E
- Country: Poland
- Voivodeship: Greater Poland
- County: Międzychód
- Gmina: Witnica

Białcz ([bjau̯t͡ʂ]; German: Bialtsch, 1943–45 Deutschhof) is a village in the administrative district of Gmina Chrzypsko Wielkie, within Międzychód County, Greater Poland Voivodeship, in west-central Poland. Its population is 213.
