= Zatom Stary =

- Village
- Location within Poland
- Coordinates: 52°38′0″N 15°58′0″E
- Country: Poland
- Voivodeship: Greater Poland
- County: Międzychód
- Gmina: Międzychód
- Population: 250

Zatom Stary [ˈzatɔm ˈstarɨ] is a village in the administrative district of Gmina Międzychód, within Międzychód County, Greater Poland Voivodeship, in west-central Poland.
