= Orle Wielkie =

- Village
- Location within Poland
- Coordinates: 52°38′00″N 16°18′00″E
- Country: Poland
- Voivodeship: Greater Poland
- County: Międzychód
- Gmina: Chrzypsko Wielkie

Orle Wielkie [ˈɔrlɛ ˈvjɛlkʲɛ] is a village in the administrative district of Gmina Chrzypsko Wielkie, within Międzychód County, Greater Poland Voivodeship, in west-central Poland.
