= Borowy Młyn, Greater Poland Voivodeship =

Borowy Młyn
- Village
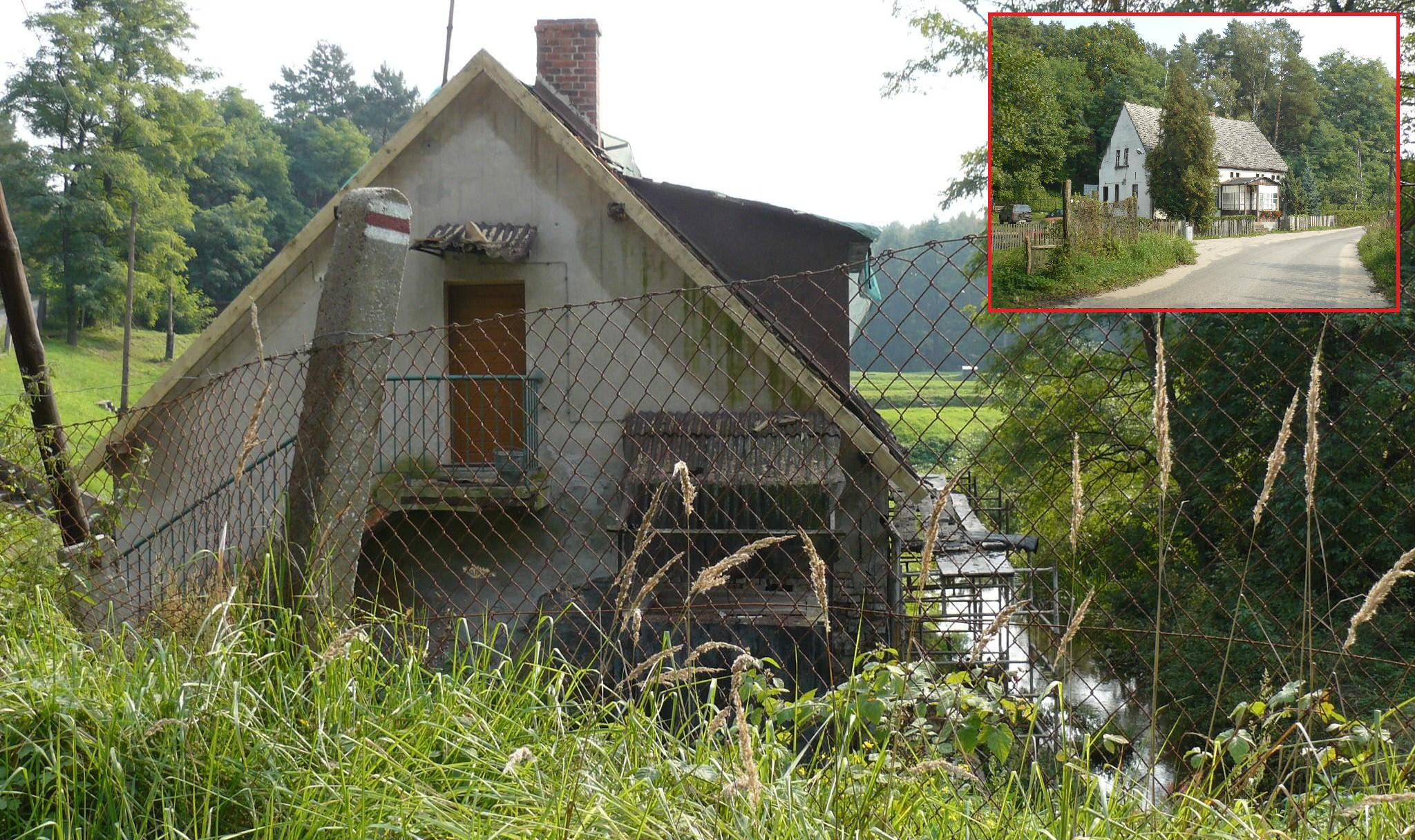

- Location within Poland
- Coordinates: 52°40′30″N 16°2′31″E
- Country: Poland
- Voivodeship: Greater Poland
- County: Międzychód
- Gmina: Sieraków

Borowy Młyn [bɔˈrɔvɨ ˈmwɨn] is a village in the administrative district of Gmina Sieraków, within Międzychód County, Greater Poland Voivodeship, in west-central Poland.
