= Gorzycko =

- Village
- Location within Poland
- Coordinates: 52°34′N 15°51′E
- Country: Poland
- Voivodeship: Greater Poland
- County: Międzychód
- Gmina: Międzychód

Gorzycko [ɡɔˈʐɨt͡skɔ] is a village in the administrative district of Gmina Międzychód, within Międzychód County, Greater Poland Voivodeship, in west-central Poland.
