= Popowo, Międzychód County =

Popowo
- Village
- Location within Poland
- Coordinates: 52°36′N 16°1′E
- Country: Poland
- Voivodeship: Greater Poland
- County: Międzychód
- Gmina: Międzychód

Popowo ([pɔˈpɔvɔ]; German: 1939–1945 Seetal) is a village in the administrative district of Gmina Międzychód, within Międzychód County, Greater Poland Voivodeship, in west-central Poland.
