= Kukułka, Międzychód County =

Kukułka
- Village
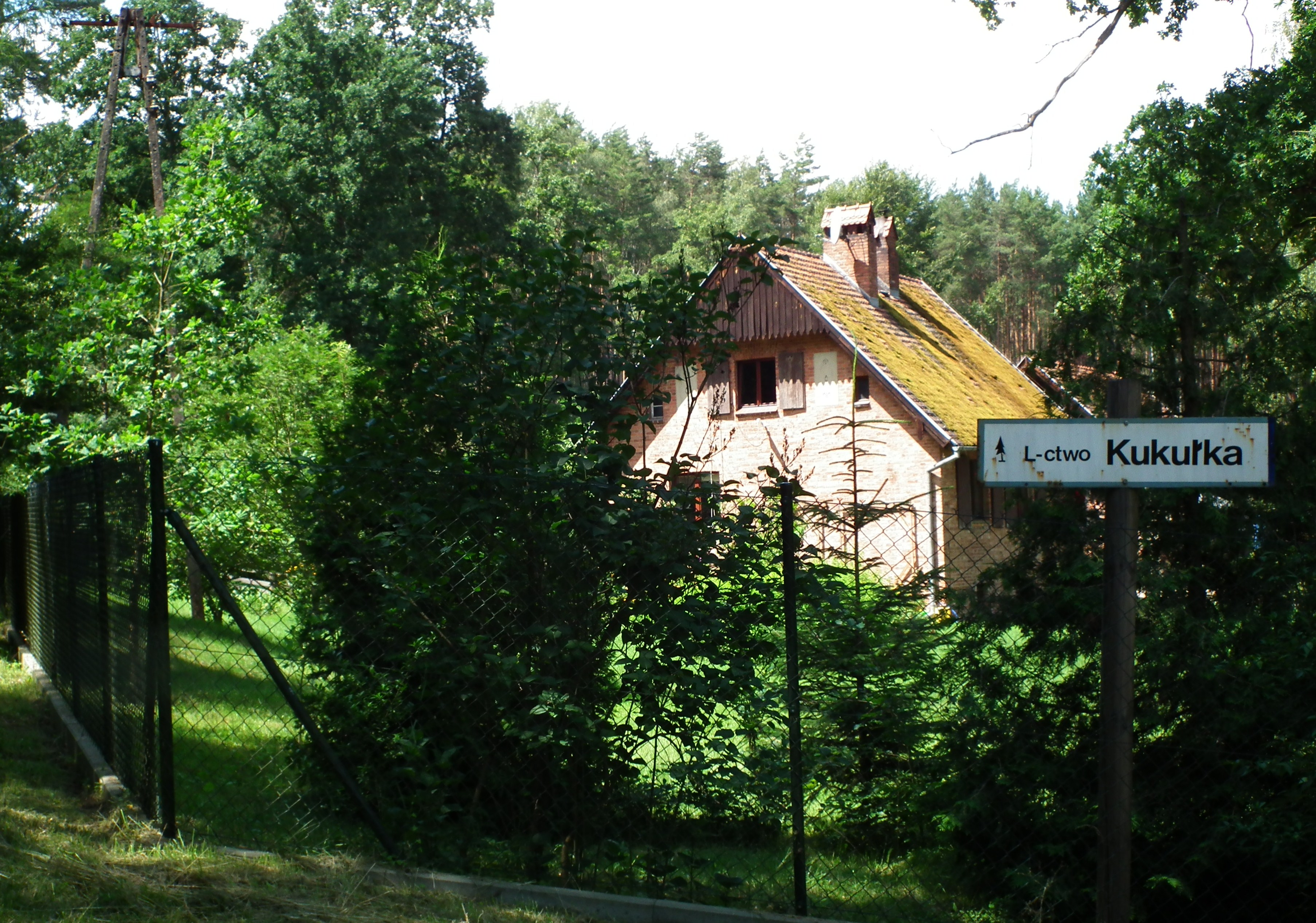
- Road sign in Kukulka, Notec Forest

- Location within Poland
- Coordinates: 52°40′30″N 16°01′36″E
- Country: Poland
- Voivodeship: Greater Poland
- County: Międzychód
- Gmina: Sieraków

Kukułka [kuˈkuu̯ka] is a village in the administrative district of Gmina Sieraków, within Międzychód County, Greater Poland Voivodeship, in west-central Poland.
