= Strzyżmin =

- Village
- Location within Poland
- Coordinates: 52°38′22″N 16°16′55″E
- Country: Poland
- Voivodeship: Greater Poland
- County: Międzychód
- Gmina: Chrzypsko Wielkie
- Population: 40

Strzyżmin [ˈstʂɨʐmin] is a village in the administrative district of Gmina Chrzypsko Wielkie, within Międzychód County, Greater Poland Voivodeship, in west-central Poland.
