= Zielona, Greater Poland Voivodeship =

Zielona
- Settlement
- Location within Poland
- Coordinates: 52°36′41″N 15°56′05″E
- Country: Poland
- Voivodeship: Greater Poland
- County: Międzychód
- Gmina: Międzychód

Zielona [ʑɛˈlɔna] is a settlement in the administrative district of Gmina Międzychód, within Międzychód County, Greater Poland Voivodeship, in west-central Poland.
