= Mierzynek =

Mierzynek may refer to the following places:

- Mierzynek, Greater Poland Voivodeship (west-central Poland)
- Mierzynek, Kuyavian-Pomeranian Voivodeship (north-central Poland)
- Mierzynek, West Pomeranian Voivodeship (north-west Poland)
