= Przedlesie =

- Settlement
- Location within Poland
- Coordinates: 52°36′36″N 15°52′41″E
- Country: Poland
- Voivodeship: Greater Poland
- County: Międzychód
- Gmina: Międzychód

Przedlesie [pʂɛˈdlɛɕɛ] is a settlement in the administrative district of Gmina Międzychód, within Międzychód County, Greater Poland Voivodeship, in west-central Poland.
