= Puszcza, Greater Poland Voivodeship =

Village in Greater Poland Voivodeship, Poland

Puszcza
- Village
- Location within Poland
- Coordinates: 52°36′36″N 15°51′22″E
- Country: Poland
- Voivodeship: Greater Poland
- County: Międzychód
- Gmina: Międzychód

Puszcza [ˈpuʂt͡ʂa] is a village in the administrative district of Gmina Międzychód, within Międzychód County, Greater Poland Voivodeship, in west-central Poland.
