= Głażewo =

Głażewo may refer to the following places in Poland:

- Głażewo, Kuyavian-Pomeranian Voivodeship (north-central Poland)
- Głażewo, Greater Poland Voivodeship (west-central Poland)
