= Kamionna-Wiktorowo =

- Settlement
- Location within Poland
- Coordinates: 52°34′27″N 15°55′44″E
- Country: Poland
- Voivodeship: Greater Poland
- County: Międzychód
- Gmina: Międzychód

Kamionna-Wiktorowo [kaˈmjɔnna viktɔˈrɔvɔ] is a settlement in the administrative district of Gmina Międzychód, within Międzychód County, Greater Poland Voivodeship, in west-central Poland.
