= Kobylarnia, Greater Poland Voivodeship =

Kobylarnia
- Village
- Location within Poland
- Coordinates: 52°38′36″N 16°1′55″E
- Country: Poland
- Voivodeship: Greater Poland
- County: Międzychód
- Gmina: Sieraków
- Population: 30

Kobylarnia [kɔbɨˈlarɲa] is a village in the administrative district of Gmina Sieraków, within Międzychód County, Greater Poland Voivodeship, in west-central Poland.
