= Charcice =

- Village
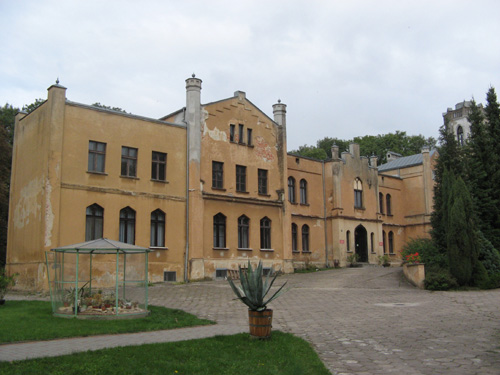
- Manor in Charcice

- Location within Poland
- Coordinates: 52°38′44″N 16°12′53″E
- Country: Poland
- Voivodeship: Greater Poland
- County: Międzychód
- Gmina: Chrzypsko Wielkie

Charcice [xarˈt͡ɕit͡sɛ] is a village in the administrative district of Gmina Chrzypsko Wielkie, within Międzychód County, Greater Poland Voivodeship, in west-central Poland.
