= Jeleniec =

Jeleniec may refer to the following places:

- Jeleniec, Greater Poland Voivodeship (west-central Poland)
- Jeleniec, Kuyavian-Pomeranian Voivodeship (north-central Poland)
- Jeleniec, Lublin Voivodeship (east Poland)
