= Jeziorno, Greater Poland Voivodeship =

Jeziorno
- Settlement
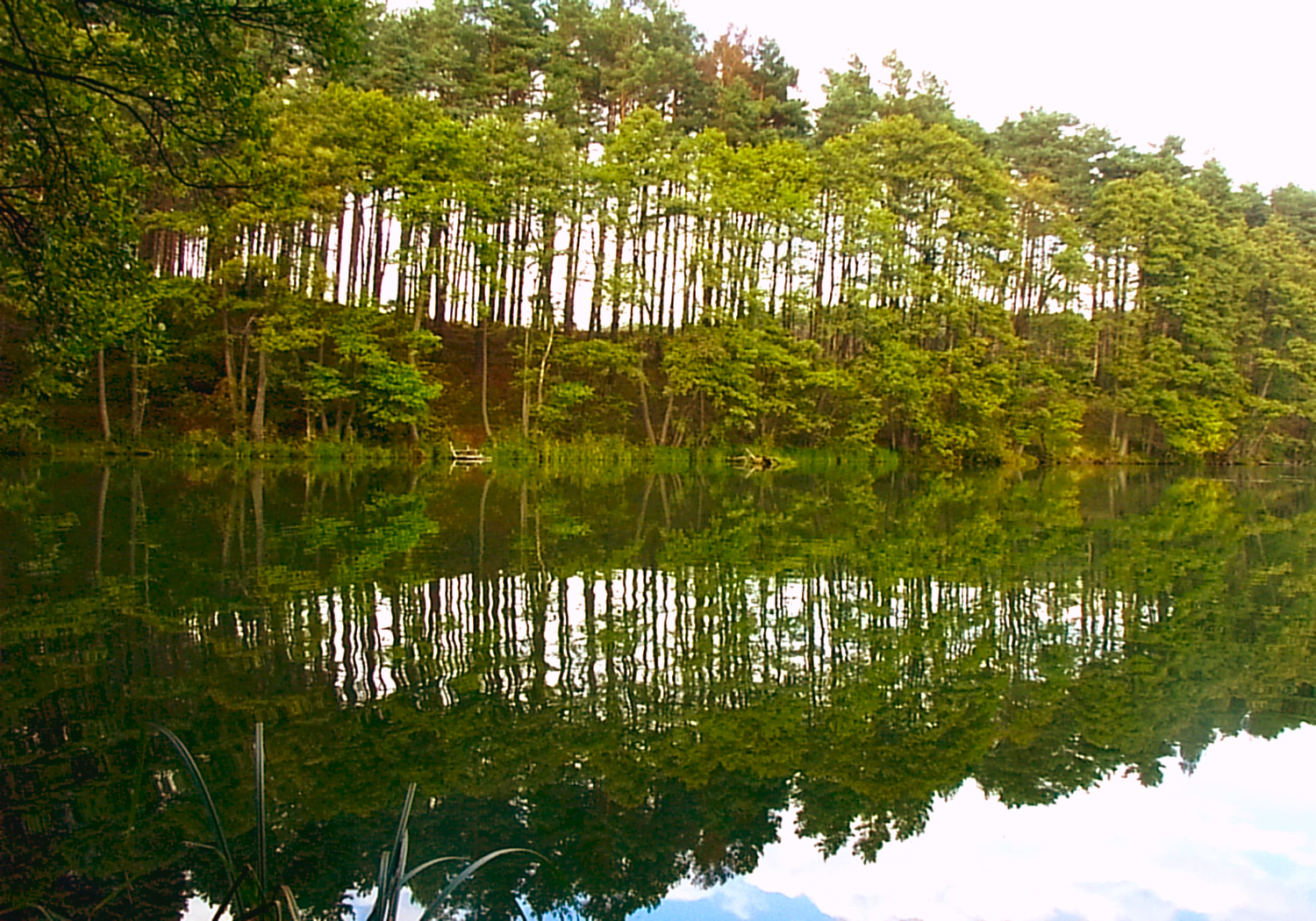

- Location within Poland
- Coordinates: 52°40′55″N 16°04′57″E
- Country: Poland
- Voivodeship: Greater Poland
- County: Międzychód
- Gmina: Sieraków

Jeziorno [jɛˈʑɔrnɔ] is a settlement in the administrative district of Gmina Sieraków, within Międzychód County, Greater Poland Voivodeship, in west-central Poland.
