= Zwierzyniec, Greater Poland Voivodeship =

Zwierzyniec
- Village
- Location within Poland
- Coordinates: 52°39′7″N 15°55′39″E
- Country: Poland
- Voivodeship: Greater Poland
- County: Międzychód
- Gmina: Międzychód
- Population: 30

Zwierzyniec (Polish: [zvjɛˈʐɨɲɛt͡s]) is a village in the administrative district of Gmina Międzychód, within Międzychód County, Greater Poland Voivodeship, in west-central Poland.
