= Bielsko, Międzychód County =

Bielsko
- Village
- Location within Poland
- Coordinates: 52°36′21″N 15°55′7″E
- Country: Poland
- Voivodeship: Greater Poland
- County: Międzychód
- Gmina: Międzychód
- Population: 1,300

Bielsko [ˈbjɛlskɔ] is a village in the administrative district of Gmina Międzychód, within Międzychód County, Greater Poland Voivodeship, in west-central Poland.
