= Muchocin =

- Village
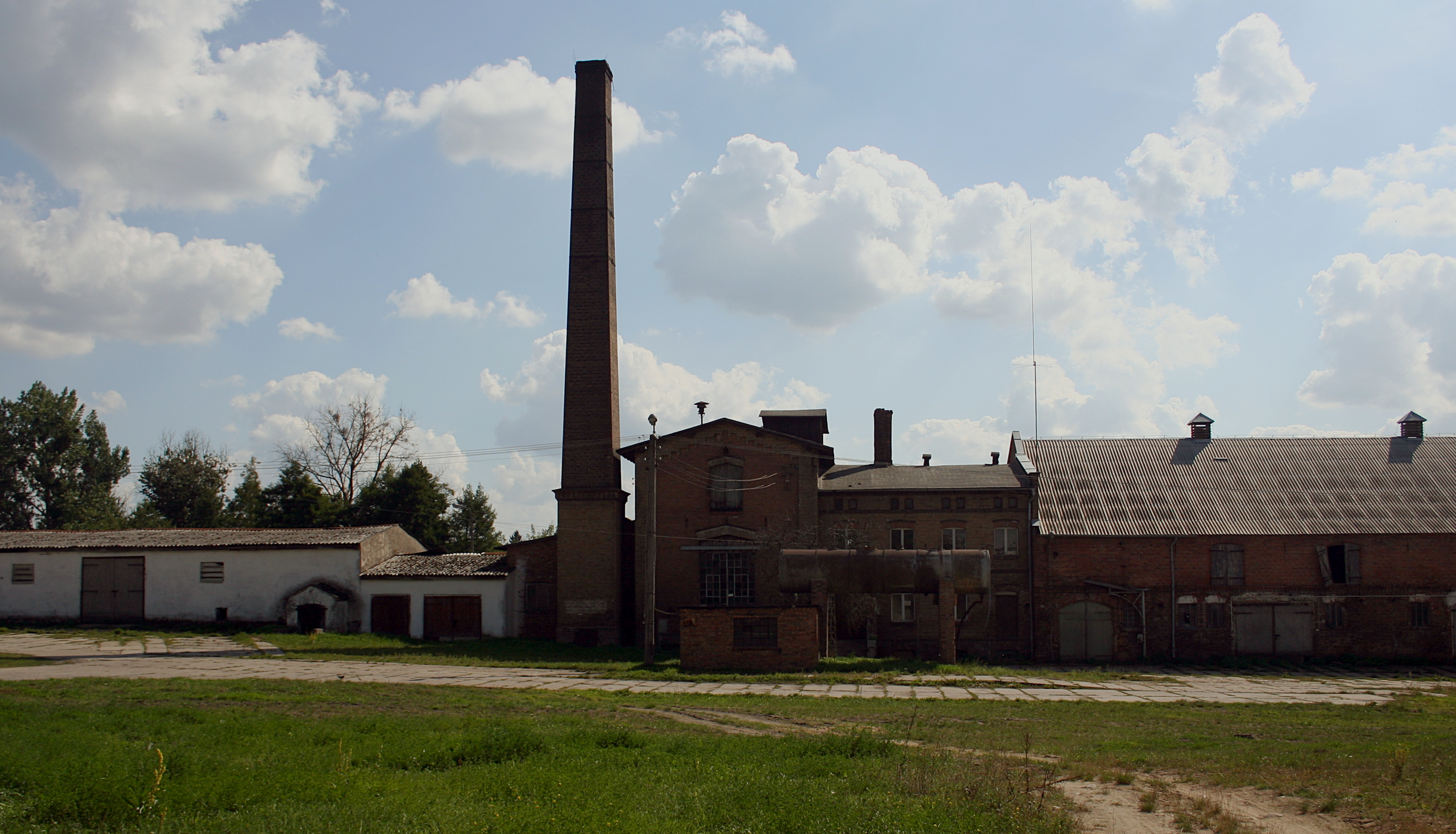
- Muchochin

- Location within Poland
- Coordinates: 52°36′11″N 15°50′43″E
- Country: Poland
- Voivodeship: Greater Poland
- County: Międzychód
- Gmina: Międzychód

Muchocin [muˈxɔt͡ɕin] is a village in the administrative district of Gmina Międzychód, within Międzychód County, Greater Poland Voivodeship, in west-central Poland.
