= Gralewo =

Gralewo may refer to the following places:

- Gralewo, Greater Poland Voivodeship (west-central Poland)
- Gralewo, Lubusz Voivodeship (west Poland)
- Gralewo, Warmian-Masurian Voivodeship (north Poland)
