= Ławica =

Ławica may refer to the following places in Poland:

- Poznań-Ławica Airport (IATA: POZ, ICAO: EPPO) in the city of Poznań in western Poland
- Ławica, Poznań part of the Grunwald district of Poznań
- Ławica, Międzychód County (west-central Poland)
- Ławica, Lower Silesian Voivodeship (south-west Poland)
