= Dębowiec, Międzychód County =

Dębowiec
- Settlement
- Location within Poland
- Coordinates: 52°44′57″N 15°57′33″E
- Country: Poland
- Voivodeship: Greater Poland
- County: Międzychód
- Gmina: Sieraków
- Population: 91

Dębowiec [dɛmˈbɔvjɛt͡s] is a settlement in the administrative district of Gmina Sieraków, within Międzychód County, Greater Poland Voivodeship, in west-central Poland.
