= Piłka =

Piłka or Pilka may refer to the following places:

- Piłka, Chodzież County in Greater Poland Voivodeship (west-central Poland)
- Piłka, Czarnków-Trzcianka County in Greater Poland Voivodeship (west-central Poland)
- Piłka, Międzychód County in Greater Poland Voivovery vabcentral Poland)
- Piłka, Gmina Herby in Silesian Voivodeship (south Poland)
- Piłka, Gmina Koszęcin in Silesian Voivodeship (south Poland)
- Pilka, Estonia, village in Luunja Parish, Tartu County, Estonia
