= Kaliska, Międzychód County =

Kaliska
- Settlement
- Location within Poland
- Coordinates: 52°28′55″N 16°0′42″E
- Country: Poland
- Voivodeship: Greater Poland
- County: Międzychód
- Gmina: Międzychód

Kaliska [kaˈliska] is a settlement in the administrative district of Gmina Międzychód, within Międzychód County, Greater Poland Voivodeship, in west-central Poland.
