= Kamionna, Greater Poland Voivodeship =

Kamionna
- Village
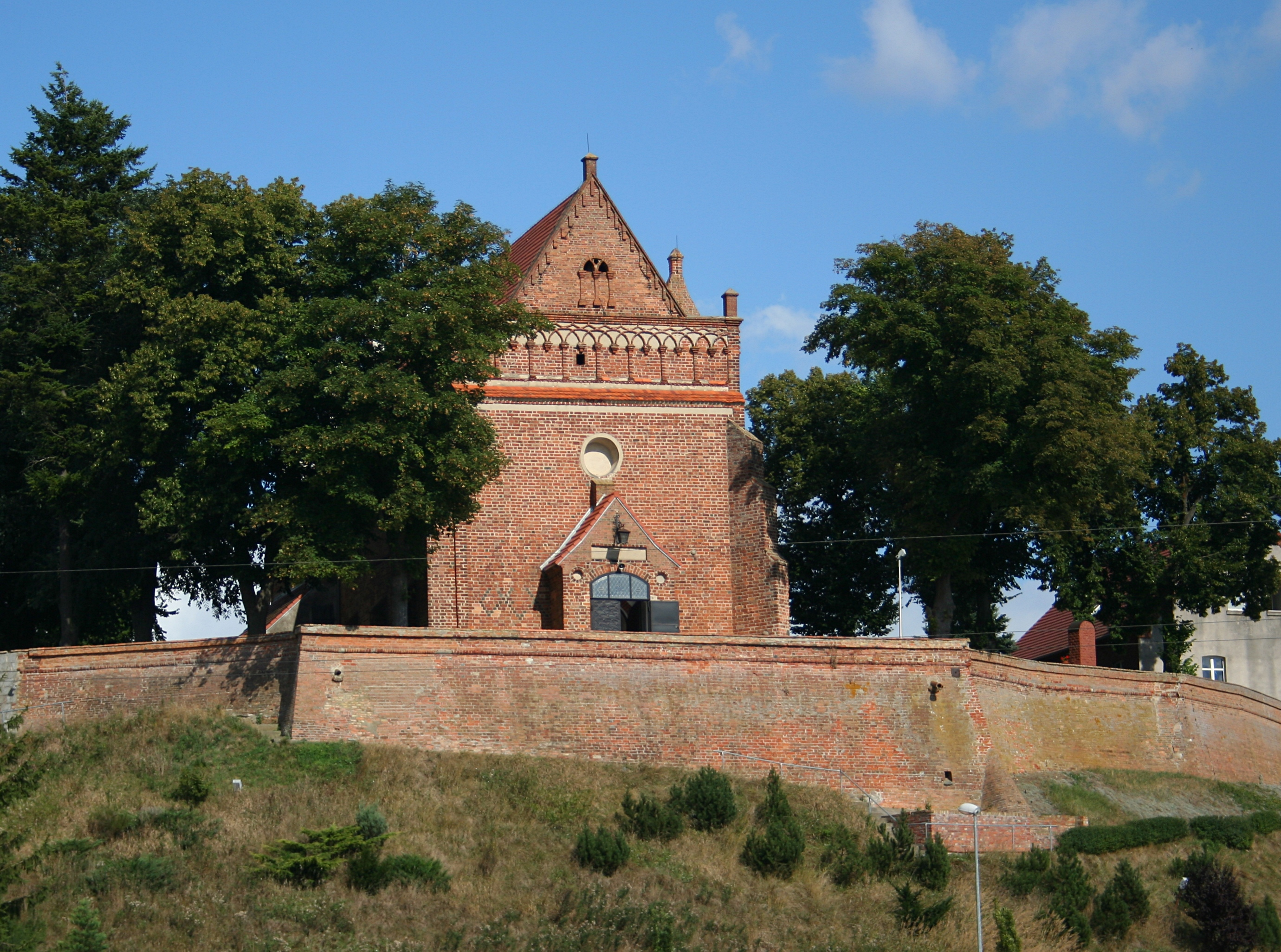
- Church of the Nativity of the Virgin Mary

- Location within Poland
- Coordinates: 52°33′52″N 15°57′42″E
- Country: Poland
- Voivodeship: Greater Poland
- County: Międzychód
- Gmina: Międzychód

Population
  - Total: 530

Kamionna [kaˈmjɔnna] is a village in the administrative district of Gmina Międzychód, within Międzychód County, Greater Poland Voivodeship, in west-central Poland.
