= Chalin, Greater Poland Voivodeship =

Chalin
- Village
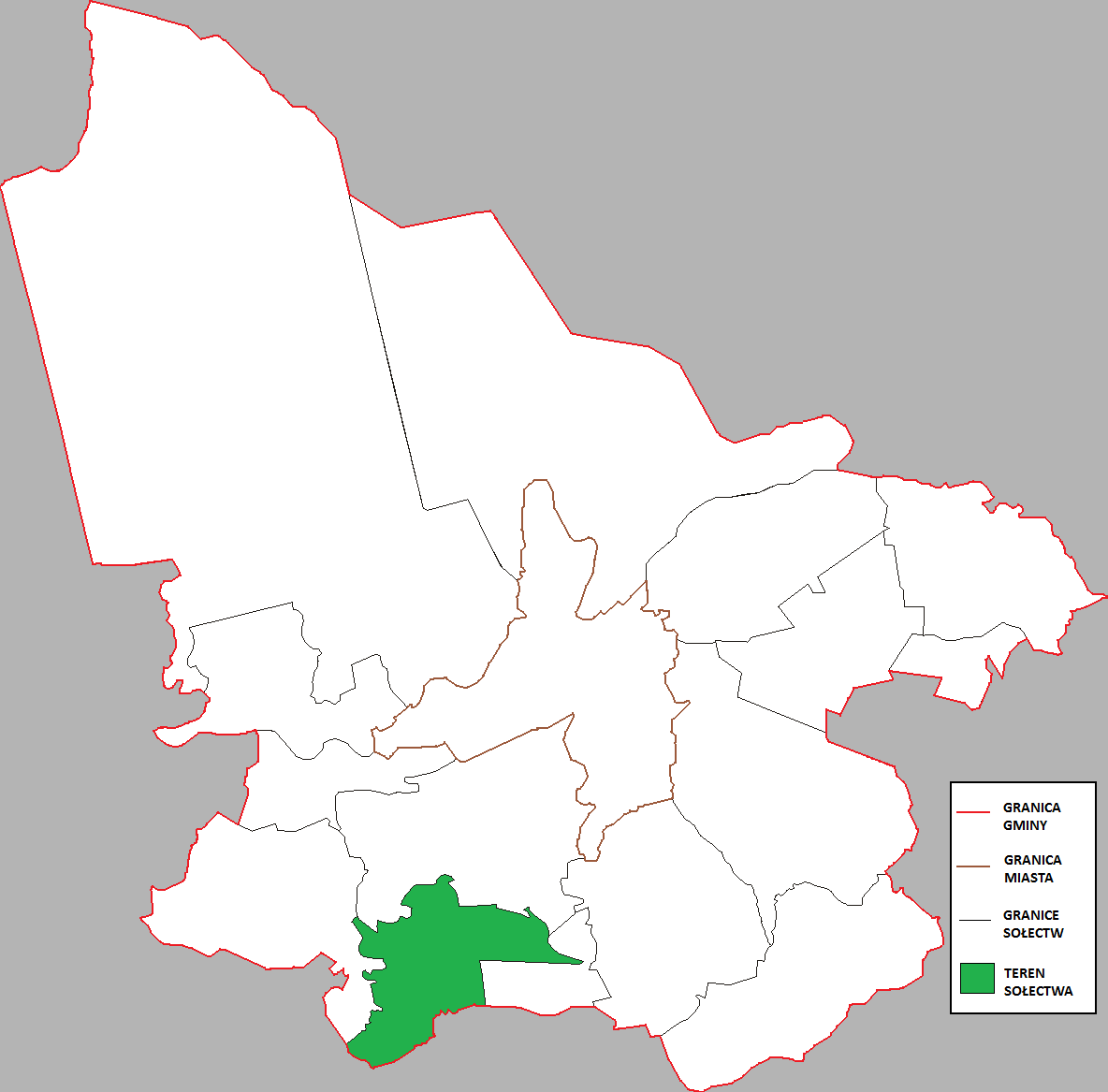

- Location within Poland
- Coordinates: 52°36′7″N 16°2′17″E
- Country: Poland
- Voivodeship: Greater Poland
- County: Międzychód
- Gmina: Sieraków
- Population: 30

Chalin [ˈxalin] is a village in the administrative district of Gmina Sieraków, within Międzychód County, Greater Poland Voivodeship, in west-central Poland.
