= Jabłonowo, Międzychód County =

Jabłonowo
- Village
- Location within Poland
- Coordinates: 52°39′23″N 16°11′36″E
- Country: Poland
- Voivodeship: Greater Poland
- County: Międzychód
- Gmina: Sieraków
- Population: 50

Jabłonowo [jabwɔˈnɔvɔ] is a village in the administrative district of Gmina Sieraków, within Międzychód County, Greater Poland Voivodeship, in west-central Poland.
