= Czapliniec =

- Village
- Location within Poland
- Coordinates: 52°39′57″N 15°58′08″E
- Country: Poland
- Voivodeship: Greater Poland
- County: Międzychód
- Gmina: Sieraków

Czapliniec [t͡ʂaˈpliɲɛt͡s] is a village in the administrative district of Gmina Sieraków, within Międzychód County, Greater Poland Voivodeship, in west-central Poland.
