= Przemyśl, Greater Poland Voivodeship =

Przemyśl
- Village
- Location within Poland
- Coordinates: 52°37′N 16°6′E
- Country: Poland
- Voivodeship: Greater Poland
- County: Międzychód
- Gmina: Sieraków

Przemyśl (Polish pronunciation: [ˈpʂɛmɨɕl]) is a village in the administrative district of Gmina Sieraków, within Międzychód County, Greater Poland Voivodeship, in west-central Poland.
