= Śródka, Międzychód County =

Śródka
- Village
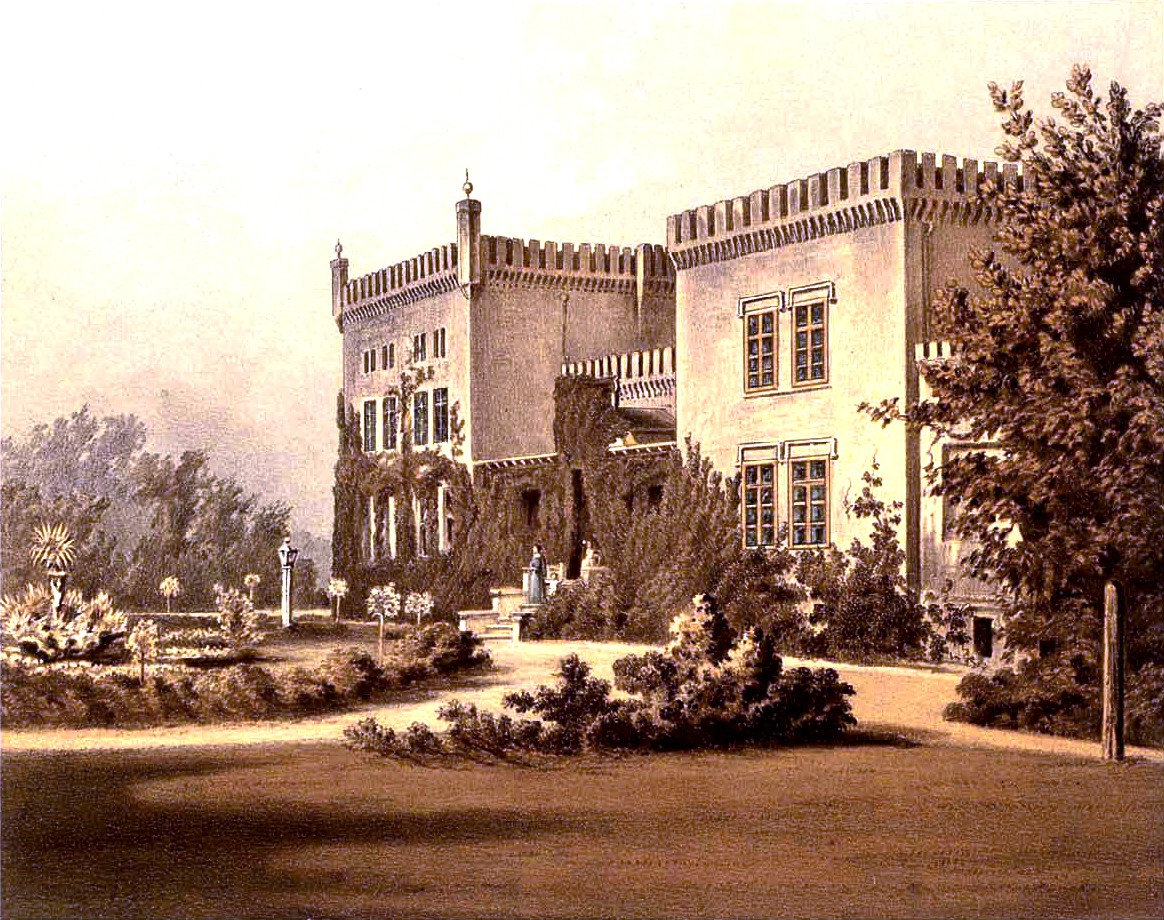
- 19th-century view of the Śródka Palace

- Location within Poland
- Coordinates: 52°38′N 16°16′E
- Country: Poland
- Voivodeship: Greater Poland
- County: Międzychód
- Gmina: Chrzypsko Wielkie
- Time zone: UTC+1 (CET)
  - Summer (DST): UTC+2 (CEST)
- Vehicle registration: PMI

Śródka [ˈɕrutka] is a village in the administrative district of Gmina Chrzypsko Wielkie, within Międzychód County, Greater Poland Voivodeship, in west-central Poland.

== Geographical location ==
The village is situated in an attractive part of Gmina Chrzypsko Wielkie, between three lakes: Wielkie (262 ha), Kuchenne (63 ha), Liśnia (19 ha).

Śródka is placed in area of Sieraków Landscape Park and in area of Natura 2000.

== History ==
Śródka was a private village of the Polish nobility, including the Pawłowski and Kurnatowski families, administratively located in the Poznań County in the Poznań Voivodeship in the Greater Poland Province of the Kingdom of Poland.
