= Radgoszcz =

Radgoszcz may refer to the following places:

- Radgoszcz, Greater Poland Voivodeship (west-central Poland)
- Radgoszcz, Lesser Poland Voivodeship (south Poland)
- Radgoszcz, Masovian Voivodeship (east-central Poland)
