= Głażewo, Greater Poland Voivodeship =

Głażewo
- Village
- Location within Poland
- Coordinates: 52°31′N 15°54′E
- Country: Poland
- Voivodeship: Greater Poland
- County: Międzychód
- Gmina: Międzychód
- Population: 621

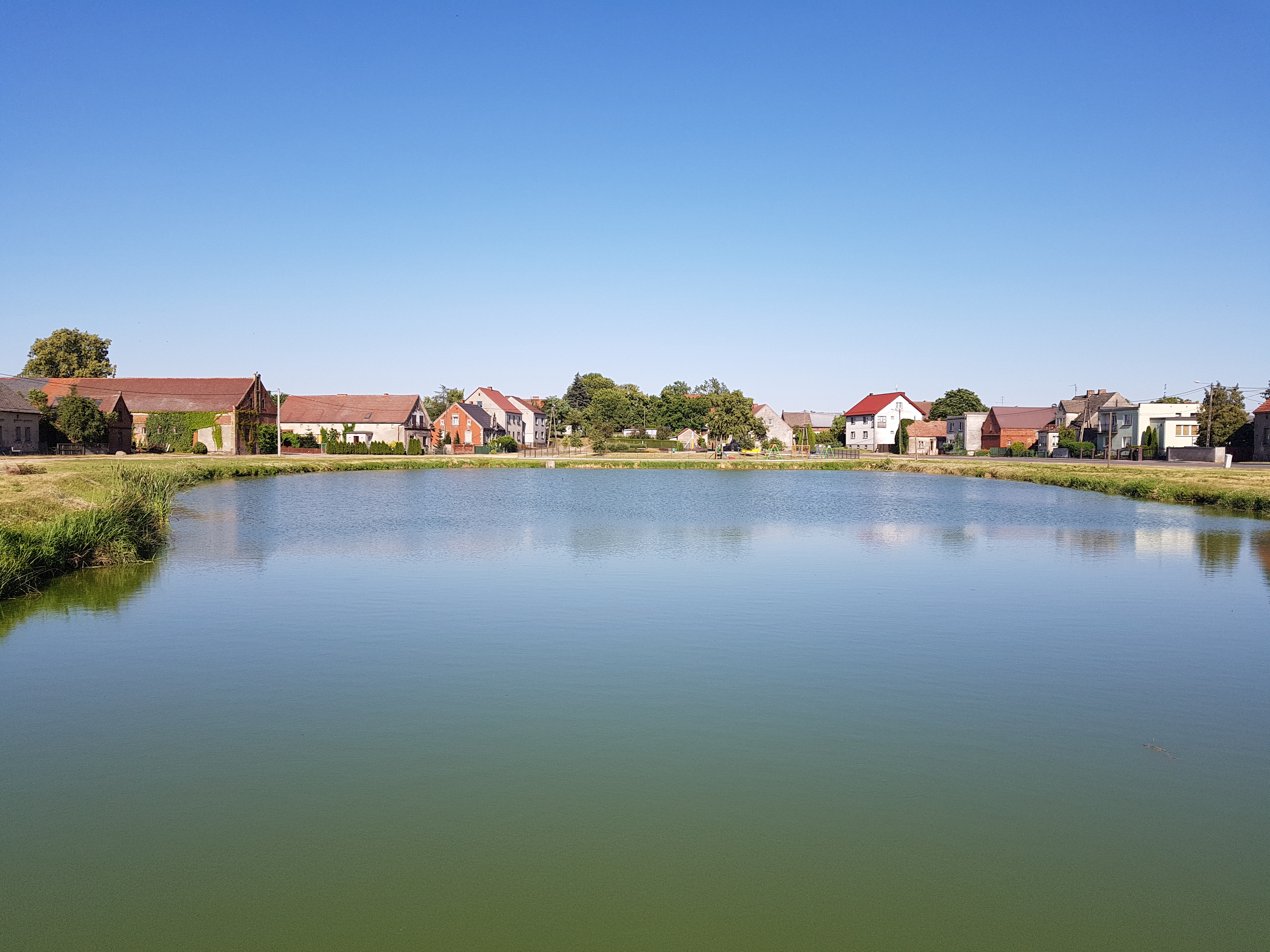
A pond in the middle of the village of Głażewo

Głażewo [ɡwaˈʐɛvɔ] is a village in the administrative district of Gmina Międzychód, within Międzychód County, Greater Poland Voivodeship, in west-central Poland.
