= Radgoszcz, Greater Poland Voivodeship =

Radgoszcz
- Village
- Location within Poland
- Coordinates: 52°39′N 15°53′E
- Country: Poland
- Voivodeship: Greater Poland
- County: Międzychód
- Gmina: Międzychód

Radgoszcz [ˈradɡɔʂt͡ʂ] is a village in the administrative district of Gmina Międzychód, within Międzychód County, Greater Poland Voivodeship, in west-central Poland.
