= Kolno, Międzychód County =

Kolno
- Village
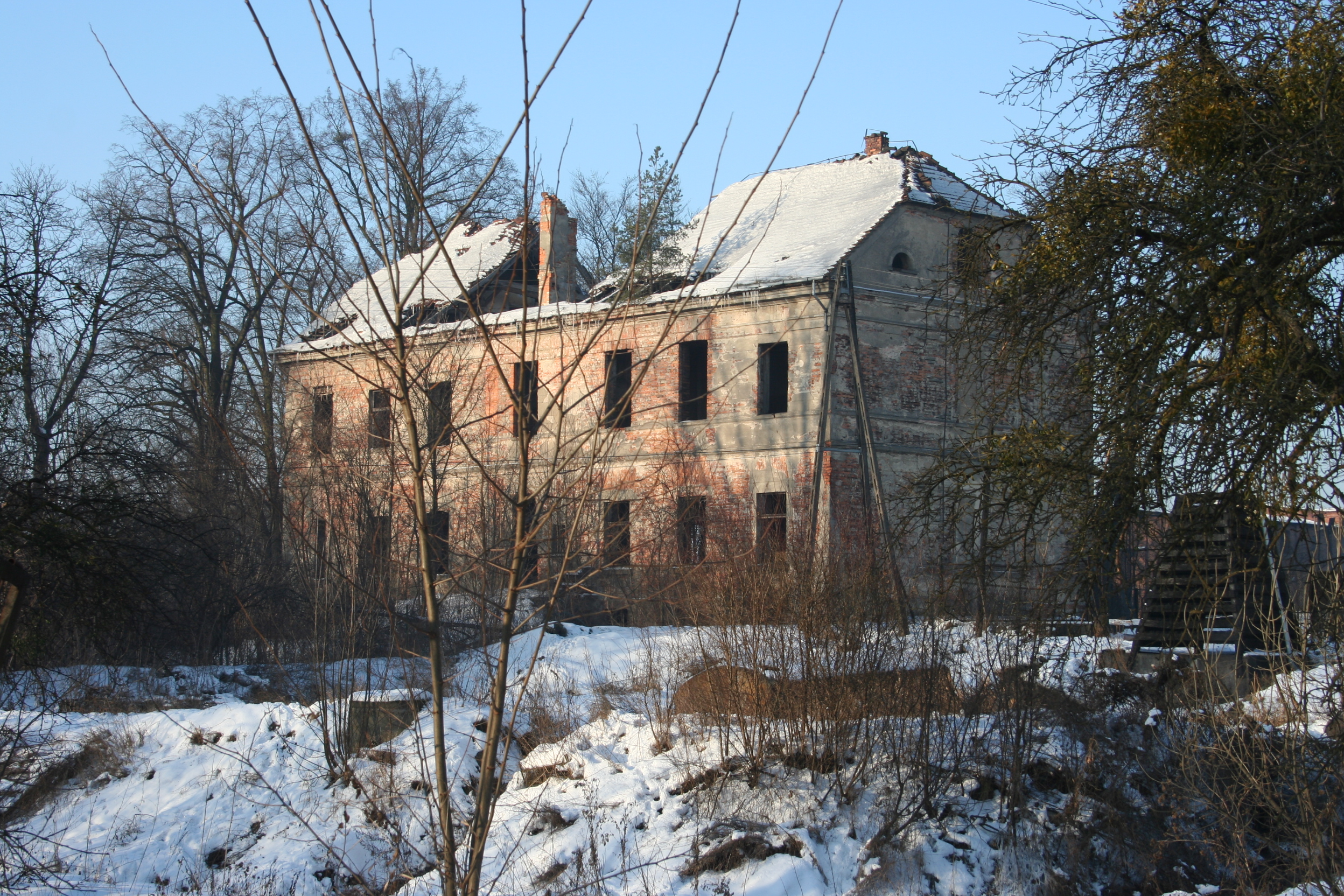
- The remains of the manor house in Kolno Village

- Location within Poland
- Coordinates: 52°36′N 15°58′E
- Country: Poland
- Voivodeship: Greater Poland
- County: Międzychód
- Gmina: Międzychód

Kolno [ˈkɔlnɔ] is a village in the administrative district of Gmina Międzychód, within Międzychód County, Greater Poland Voivodeship, in west-central Poland.
