= Jeleniec, Greater Poland Voivodeship =

Jeleniec
- Settlement
- Location within Poland
- Coordinates: 52°41′51″N 16°04′11″E
- Country: Poland
- Voivodeship: Greater Poland
- County: Międzychód
- Gmina: Sieraków

Jeleniec [jɛˈlɛɲɛt͡s] is a settlement in the administrative district of Gmina Sieraków, within Międzychód County, Greater Poland Voivodeship, in west-central Poland.
