= Gmina Sieraków =

Gmina Sieraków Sieraków Commune
- Gmina
- Flag Coat of arms

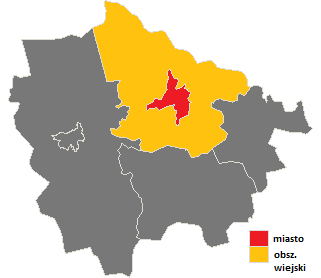
- Coordinates (Sieraków): 52°39′0″N 16°6′0″E
- Country: Poland
- Voivodeship: Greater Poland
- County: Międzychód
- Seat: Sieraków

Area
  - Total: 203.31 km^{2} (78.50 sq mi)

Population (2011)
  - Total: 8,786
  - Density: 43.21/km^{2} (111.9/sq mi)
  - Urban: 6,120
  - Rural: 2,666
- Website: www.sierakow.pl

Gmina Sieraków is an urban-rural gmina (administrative district) in Międzychód County, Greater Poland Voivodeship, in west-central Poland. Its seat is the town of Sieraków, which lies approximately 16 kilometres (10 mi) east of Międzychód and 62 km (39 mi) north-west of the regional capital Poznań.

The gmina covers an area of 203.31 square kilometres (78.5 sq mi), and as of 2006 its total population is 8,649 (out of which the population of Sieraków amounts to 5,994, and the population of the rural part of the gmina is 2,655).

== Villages ==
Apart from the town of Sieraków, Gmina Sieraków contains the villages and settlements of Błota, Borowy Młyn, Bucharzewo, Chalin, Chorzępowo, Czapliniec, Dębowiec, Góra, Gospódka, Grobia, Izdebno, Jabłonowo, Jeleniec, Jeziorno, Kaczlin, Kłosowice, Kobylarnia, Kukułka, Ławica, Lichwin, Lutom, Lutomek, Marianowo, Pławiska, Przemyśl, Śrem and Tuchola.

== Neighbouring gminas ==
Gmina Sieraków is bordered by the gminas of Chrzypsko Wielkie, Drawsko, Drezdenko, Kwilcz, Międzychód and Wronki.
