= Lichwin, Greater Poland Voivodeship =

Lichwin
- Village
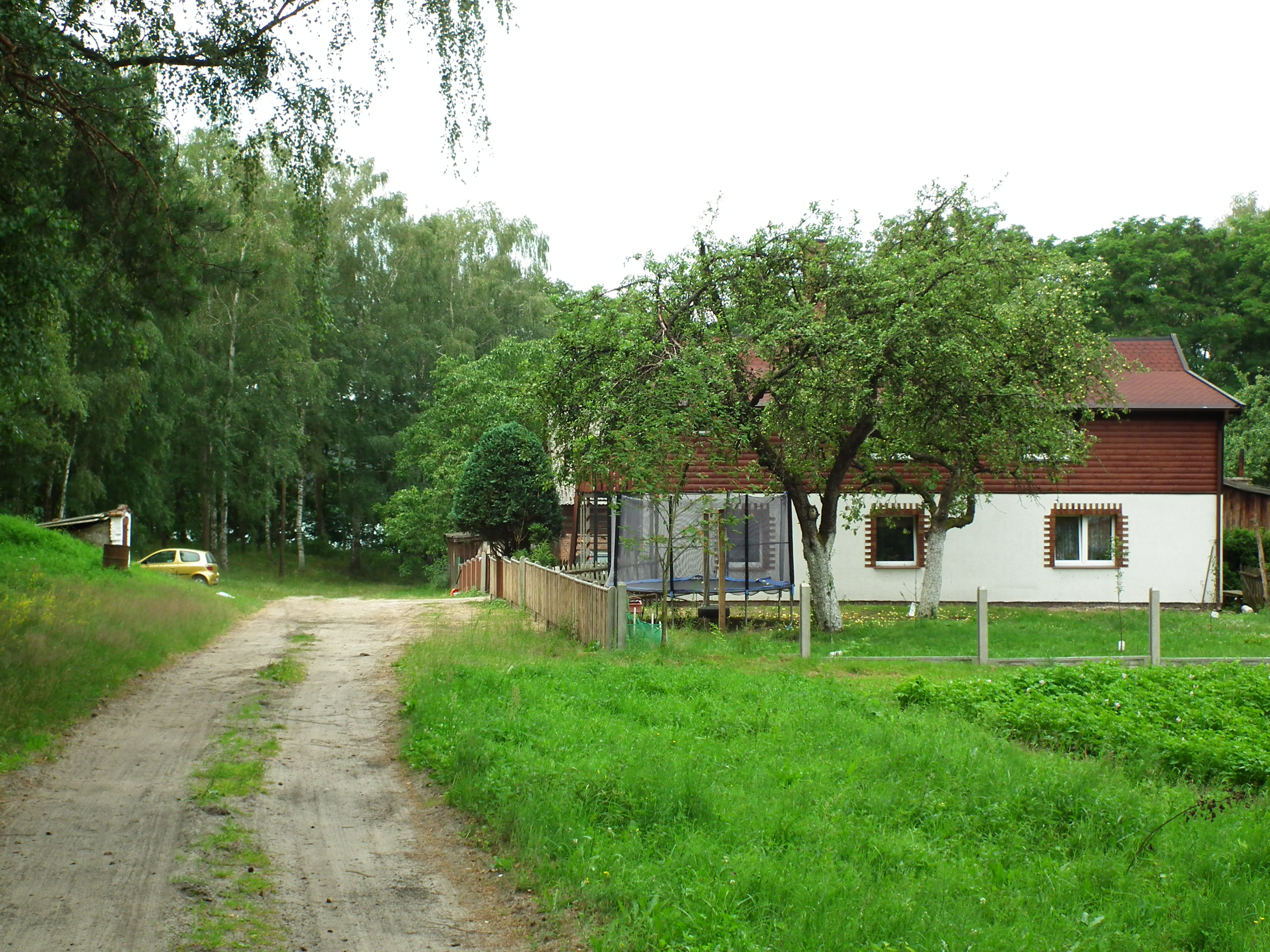
- Roadside house in Lichwin

- Location within Poland
- Coordinates: 52°41′2″N 16°3′44″E
- Country: Poland
- Voivodeship: Greater Poland
- County: Międzychód
- Gmina: Sieraków

Lichwin [ˈlixfin] is a village in the administrative district of Gmina Sieraków, within Międzychód County, Greater Poland Voivodeship, in west-central Poland.
