= Kłosowice, Greater Poland Voivodeship =

Kłosowice
- Village
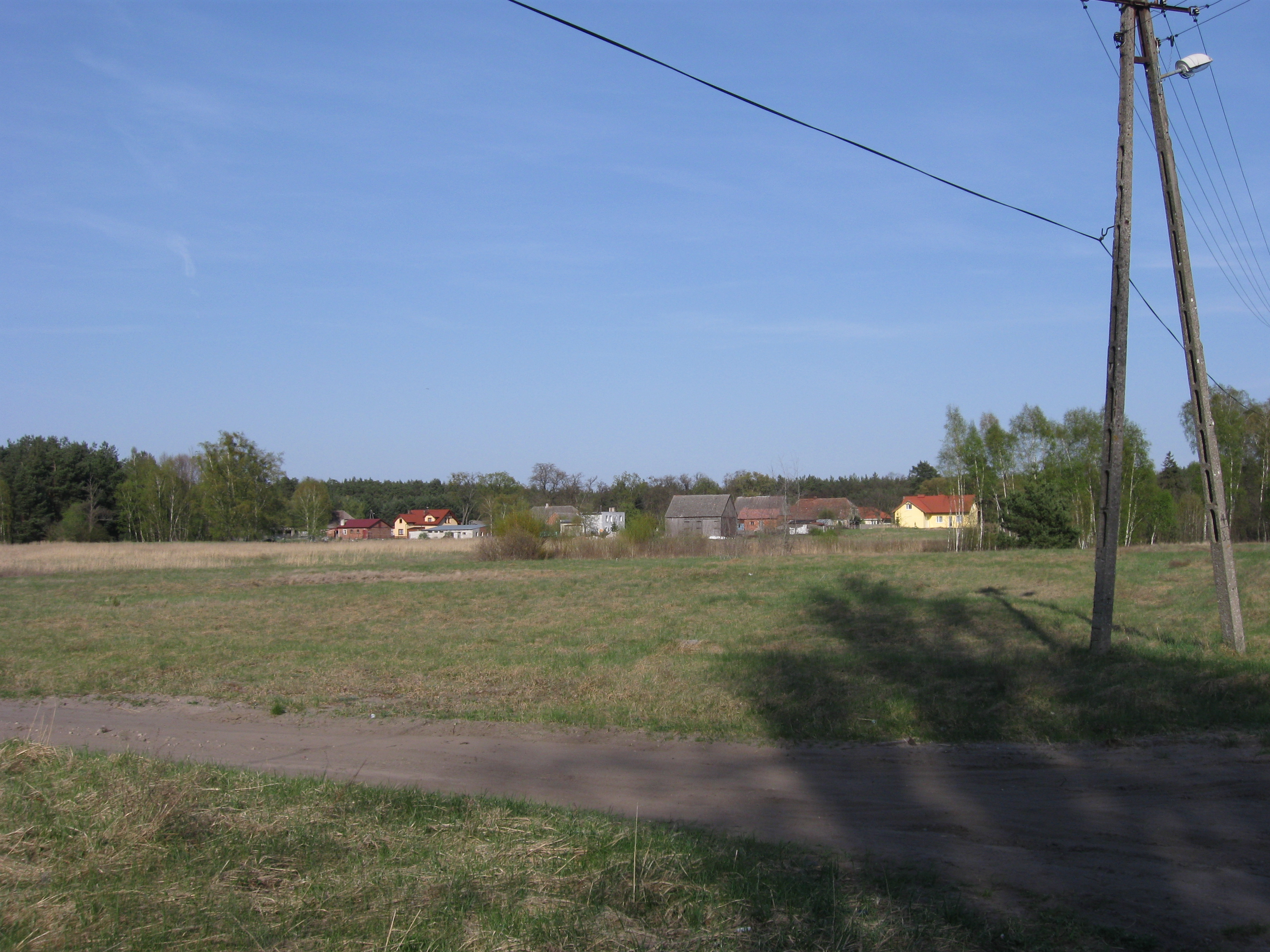
- A distant view of Kłosowice village

- Location within Poland
- Coordinates: 52°38′N 16°3′E
- Country: Poland
- Voivodeship: Greater Poland
- County: Międzychód
- Gmina: Sieraków

Kłosowice [kwɔsɔˈvit͡sɛ] is a village in the administrative district of Gmina Sieraków, within Międzychód County, Greater Poland Voivodeship, in west-central Poland.
