= Błota, Greater Poland Voivodeship =

Błota
- Village
- Location within Poland
- Coordinates: 52°41′40″N 15°58′27″E
- Country: Poland
- Voivodeship: Greater Poland
- County: Międzychód
- Gmina: Sieraków

Błota [ˈbwɔta] is a village in the administrative district of Gmina Sieraków, within Międzychód County, Greater Poland Voivodeship, in west-central Poland.
