= Chrzypsko Wielkie =

- Village
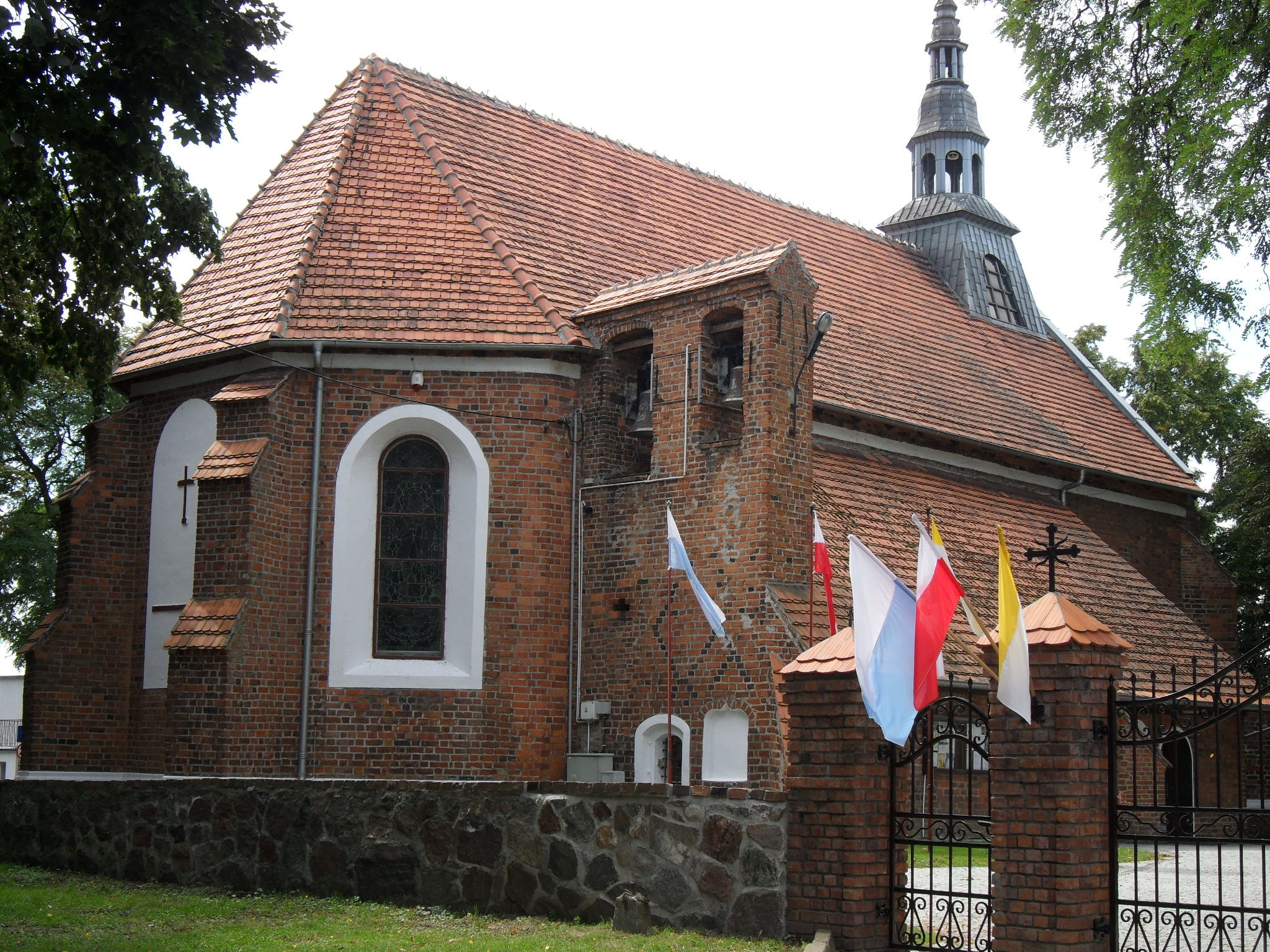
- Saint Adalbert Church

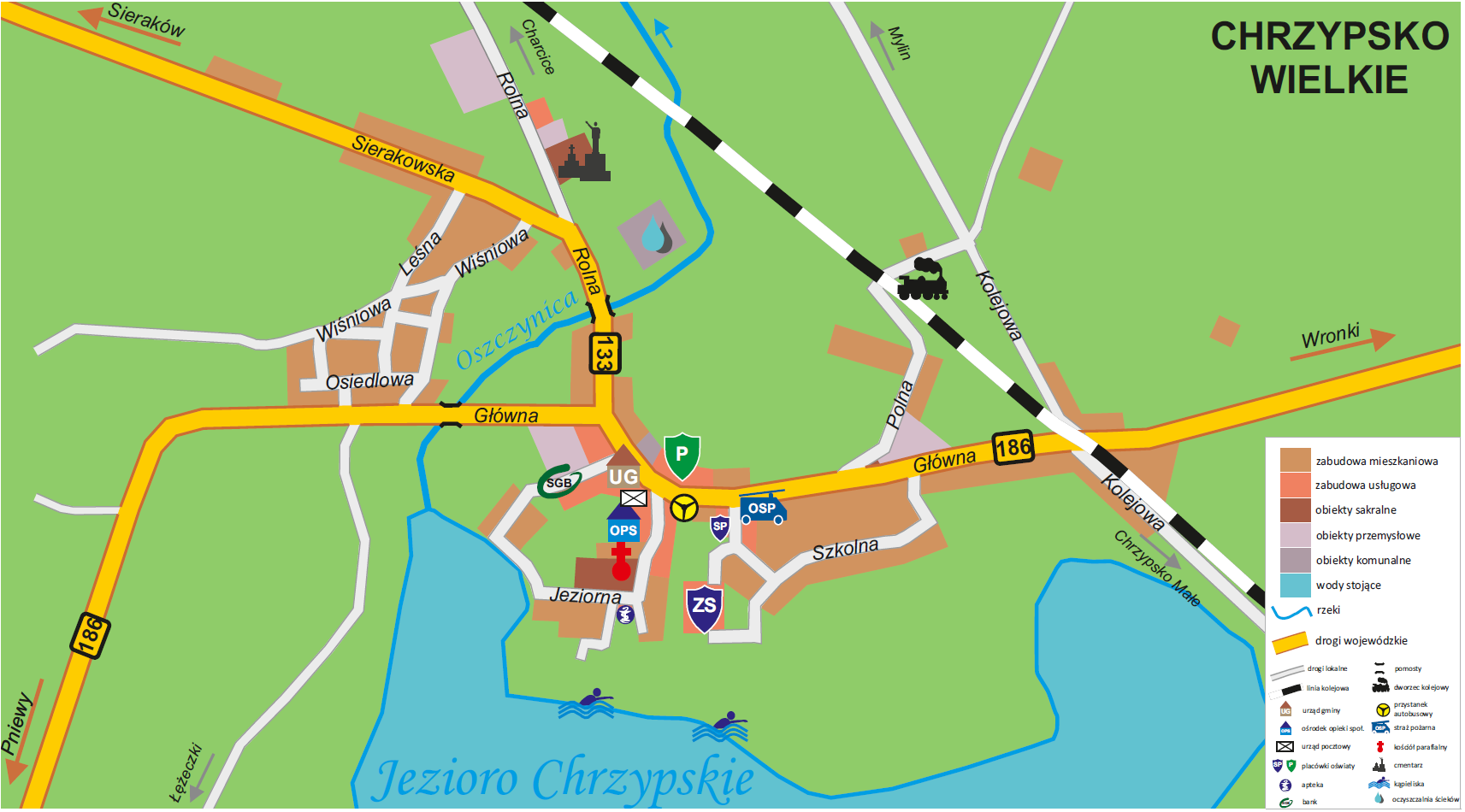

- Location within Poland
- Coordinates: 52°38′N 16°14′E
- Country: Poland
- Voivodeship: Greater Poland
- County: Międzychód
- Gmina: Chrzypsko Wielkie
- Area: 9.19 km^{2} (3.55 sq mi)
- Population: 920

Chrzypsko Wielkie [ˈxʂɨpskɔ ˈvjɛlkʲɛ] is a village in Międzychód County, Greater Poland Voivodeship, in west-central Poland. It is the seat of the gmina (administrative district) called Gmina Chrzypsko Wielkie.
