= Gmina Chrzypsko Wielkie =

Gmina Chrzypsko Wielkie Chrzypsko Wielkie Commune
- Gmina
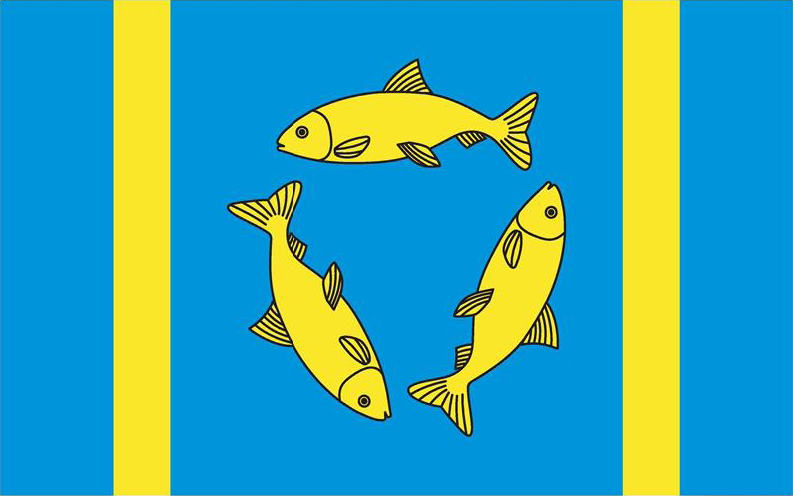
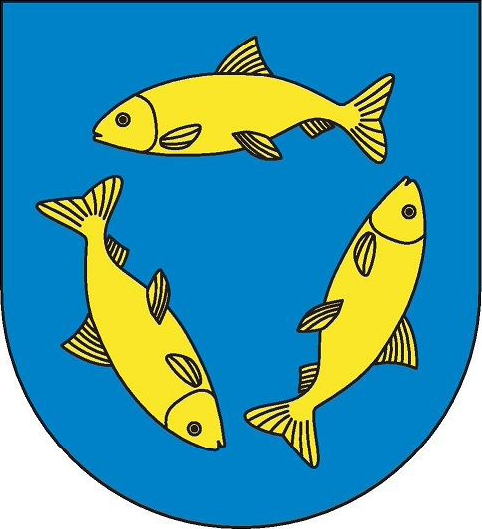
- Flag Coat of arms

- Location within Poland
- Coordinates (Chrzypsko Wielkie): 52°38′N 16°14′E
- Country: Poland
- Voivodeship: Greater Poland
- County: Międzychód
- Seat: Chrzypsko Wielkie

Area
  - Total: 84.33 km^{2} (32.56 sq mi)

Population (2011)
  - Total: 3,381
  - Density: 40.09/km^{2} (103.8/sq mi)
- Website: www.chrzypsko.pl

Gmina Chrzypsko Wielkie is a rural gmina (administrative district) in Międzychód County, Greater Poland Voivodeship, in west-central Poland. Its seat is the village of Chrzypsko Wielkie, which lies approximately 24 kilometres (15 mi) east of Międzychód and 54 km (34 mi) north-west of the regional capital Poznań.

The gmina covers an area of 84.33 square kilometres (32.6 sq mi), and as of 2006 its total population is 3,293.

== Villages ==
Gmina Chrzypsko Wielkie contains the villages and settlements of Białcz, Białokosz, Białokoszyce, Charcice, Chrzypsko Małe, Chrzypsko Wielkie, Gnuszyn, Łężce, Łężeczki, Mylin, Orle Wielkie, Ryżyn, Śródka and Strzyżmin.

== Neighbouring gminas ==
Gmina Chrzypsko Wielkie is bordered by the gminas of Kwilcz, Pniewy, Sieraków and Wronki.
