= Mierzynek, Greater Poland Voivodeship =

Mierzynek
- Village
- Location within Poland
- Coordinates: 52°38′5″N 15°50′7″E
- Country: Poland
- Voivodeship: Greater Poland
- County: Międzychód
- Gmina: Międzychód

Mierzynek [mjɛˈʐɨnɛk] is a village in the administrative district of Gmina Międzychód, within Międzychód County, Greater Poland Voivodeship, in west-central Poland.
