= Ławica, Międzychód County =

Ławica
- Village
- Location within Poland
- Coordinates: 52°37′N 16°1′E
- Country: Poland
- Voivodeship: Greater Poland
- County: Międzychód
- Gmina: Sieraków
- Population (approx.): 200

Ławica [waˈvit͡sa] is a village in the administrative district of Gmina Sieraków, within Międzychód County, Greater Poland Voivodeship, in west-central Poland.

The village has an approximate population of 200.
