= Gmina Międzychód =

Gmina Międzychód Międzychód Commune
- Gmina
- Coat of arms
- Interactive map of Gmina Międzychód
- Coordinates (Międzychód): 52°36′N 15°53′E
- Country: Poland
- Voivodeship: Greater Poland
- County: Międzychód
- Seat: Międzychód

Area
  - Total: 307.24 km^{2} (118.63 sq mi)

Population (2011)
  - Total: 18,625
  - Density: 60.620/km^{2} (157.01/sq mi)
  - Urban: 10,915
  - Rural: 7,710
- Website: www.miedzychod.pl

Gmina Międzychód is an urban-rural gmina (administrative district) in Międzychód County, Greater Poland Voivodeship, in west-central Poland. Its seat is the town of Międzychód, which lies approximately 74 kilometres (46 mi) west of the regional capital Poznań.

The gmina covers an area of 307.24 square kilometres (118.6 sq mi), and as of 2006 its total population is 18,290 (out of which the population of Międzychód amounts to 10,920, and the population of the rural part of the gmina is 7,370).

The gmina contains part of the protected area called Pszczew Landscape Park.

== Villages ==
Apart from the town of Międzychód, Gmina Międzychód contains the villages and settlements of Bielsko, Chojna, Dormowo, Drzewce, Dzięcielin, Głażewo, Gorzycko, Gorzyń, Gralewo, Kaliska, Kamionna, Kamionna-Folwark, Kamionna-Wiktorowo, Kaplin, Kolno, Krzyżkówko, Lewice, Łowyń, Mierzyn, Mierzynek, Mnichy, Mniszki, Mokrzec, Muchocin, Muchocinek, Piłka, Popowo, Przedlesie, Puszcza, Radgoszcz, Radusz, Sarzyce, Skrzydlewo, Sowia Góra, Tuczępy, Wielowieś, Zamyślin, Zatom Nowy, Zatom Stary, Zielona, Żmijowiec and Zwierzyniec.

== Neighbouring gminas ==
Gmina Międzychód is bordered by the gminas of Drezdenko, Kwilcz, Lwówek, Miedzichowo, Przytoczna, Pszczew, Sieraków and Skwierzyna.
