= Kłosowice, West Pomeranian Voivodeship =

Kłosowice
- Village
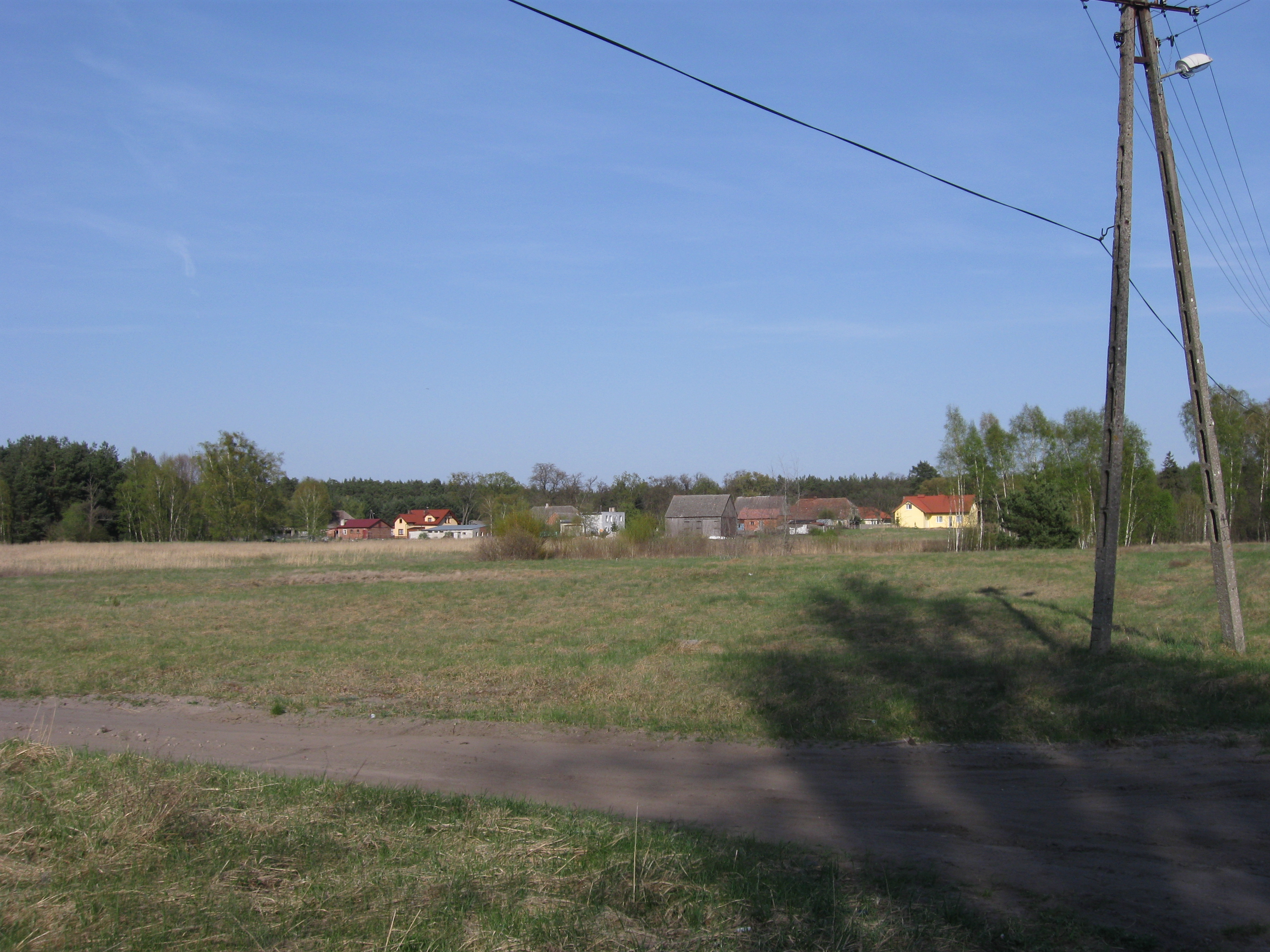
- KŁOSOWICE

- Location within Poland
- Coordinates: 53°32′10″N 14°45′24″E
- Country: Poland
- Voivodeship: West Pomeranian
- County: Goleniów
- Gmina: Goleniów

Kłosowice is a village in the administrative district of Gmina Goleniów, within Goleniów County, West Pomeranian Voivodeship, in north-western Poland.

For the history of the region, see History of Pomerania.
