= Czachorowo, Greater Poland Voivodeship =

Czachorowo
- Village
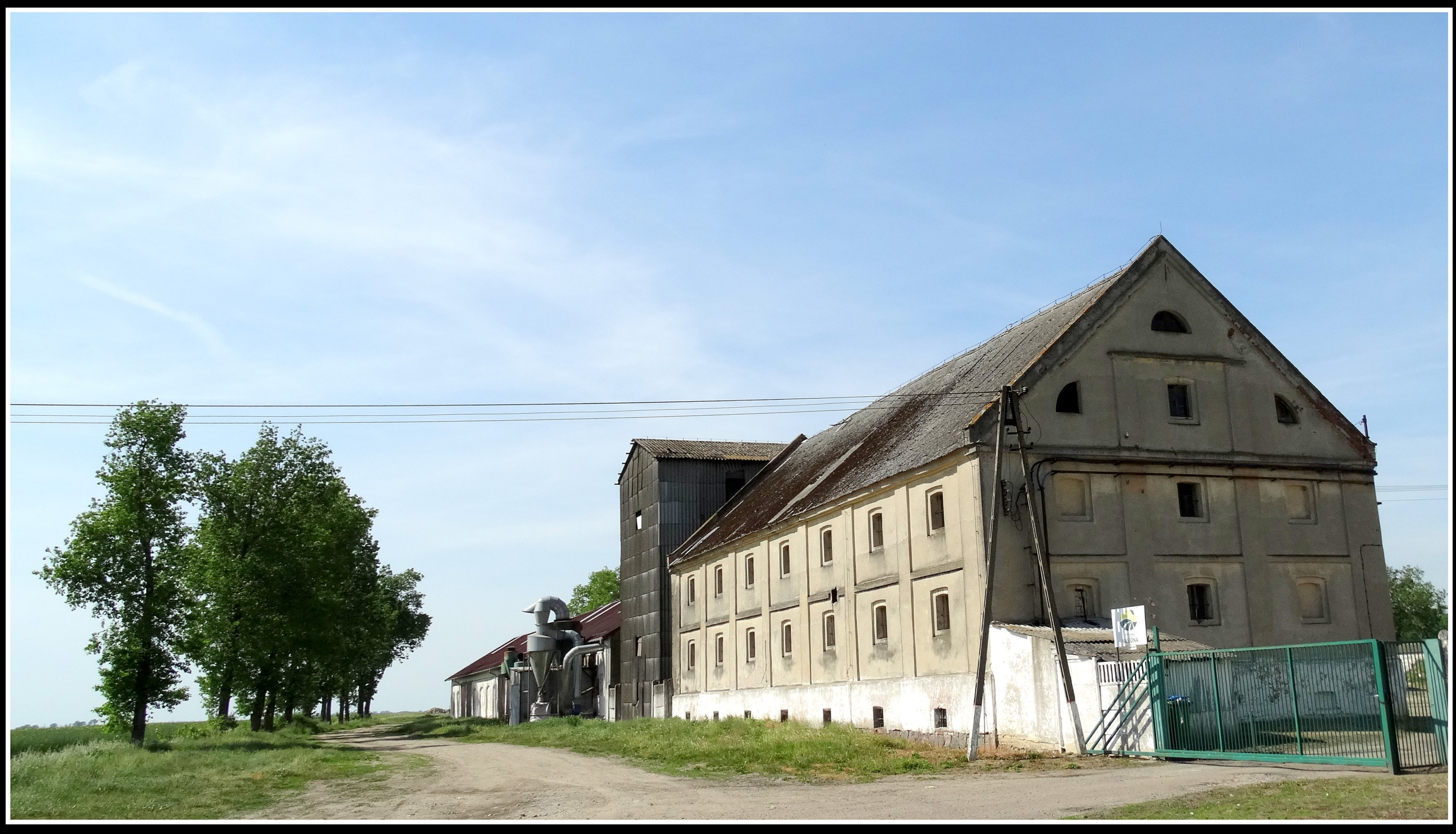

- Location within Poland
- Coordinates: 51°50′45″N 16°59′8″E
- Country: Poland
- Voivodeship: Greater Poland
- County: Gostyń
- Gmina: Gostyń
- Time zone: UTC+1 (CET)
  - Summer (DST): UTC+2 (CEST)
- Vehicle registration: PGS

Czachorowo [t͡ʂaxɔˈrɔvɔ] is a village in the administrative district of Gmina Gostyń, within Gostyń County, Greater Poland Voivodeship, in west-central Poland.
