= Międzychód County =

Międzychód County Powiat międzychodzki
- County
- Flag Coat of arms

- Location within the voivodeship

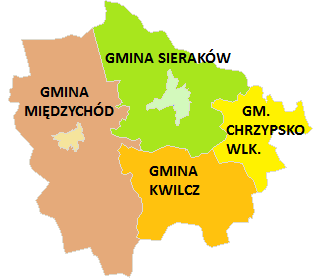
- Division into gminas
- Coordinates (Międzychód): 52°36′N 15°53′E
- Country: Poland
- Voivodeship: Greater Poland
- Seat: Międzychód
- Gminas: Total 4: Gmina Chrzypsko Wielkie; Gmina Kwilcz; Gmina Międzychód; Gmina Sieraków

Area
  - Total: 736.66 km^{2} (284.43 sq mi)

Population (2006)
  - Total: 36,329
  - Density: 49.316/km^{2} (127.73/sq mi)
  - Urban: 16,914
  - Rural: 19,415
- Car plates: PMI
- Website: www.powiat-miedzychodzki.pl

Międzychód County (Polish: powiat międzychodzki) is a unit of territorial administration and local government (powiat) in Greater Poland Voivodeship, west-central Poland. It came into being on January 1, 1999, as a result of the Polish local government reforms passed in 1998. Its administrative seat and largest town is Międzychód, which lies 74 kilometres (46 mi) west of the regional capital Poznań. The only other town in the county is Sieraków, lying 16 km (10 mi) east of Międzychód.

The county covers an area of 736.66 square kilometres (284.4 sq mi). As of 2006 its total population is 36,329, out of which the population of Międzychód is 10,920, that of Sieraków is 5,994, and the rural population is 19,415.

== Neighbouring counties ==
Międzychód County is bordered by Czarnków-Trzcianka County to the north-east, Szamotuły County to the east, Nowy Tomyśl County to the south, Międzyrzecz County to the south-west and Strzelce-Drezdenko County to the north-west.

== Administrative divisions ==
The county is subdivided into four gminas (two urban-rural and two rural). These are listed in the following table, in descending order of population.

Gmina	Type	Area (km²)	Population (2006)	Seat
Gmina Międzychód	urban-rural	307.2	18,290	Międzychód
Gmina Sieraków	urban-rural	203.3	8,649	Sieraków
Gmina Kwilcz	rural	141.8	6,097	Kwilcz
Gmina Chrzypsko Wielkie	rural	84.3	3,293	Chrzypsko Wielkie
