= Kreis Birnbaum =

Kreis Birnbaum after 1887

Kreis Birnbaum (Polish: Powiat międzychodzki) was a district in Prussia (Kreis) in the west of the Grand Duchy of Posen and the succeeding Province of Posen, as part of Regierungsbezirk Posen between 1815 and 1920. Today the area belongs to the Polish voivodeships of Greater Poland and Lubusz.

== History ==
The lands around the Greater Polish town of Międzychód had been part of the Poznań Voivodeship since the 14th century, they were annexed by the Kingdom of Prussia during the Second Partition of Poland in 1793. Part of Napoleon's titular Duchy of Warsaw from 1807, it was returned to Prussia at the 1815 Congress of Vienna. The district's borders were finally determined by resolution of 1818. The administrative seat from 1833 was at Zirke, from 1867 in Birnbaum itself.

Along with the Province of Posen, Kreis Birnbaum became part of the German Empire in 1871. With effect of 1 October 1887, its westernmost part, including Schwerin an der Warthe and Blesen was separated as Kreis Schwerin an der Warthe.

In the aftermath of the German collapse on the Western Front in World War I, the Treaty of Versailles awarded most of the province, including Kreis Birnbaum, to the new state of Poland. The handover was executed by between 17 January and 4 February 1920.

== Demographics ==
Before the bifurcation of the district in 1887, it had a German majority population. According to the Prussian census of 1860, it had a population of 45,425, of which 34,608 (76.2%) were Germans and 10,817 (23.8%) were Poles. The district population, after the separation of the predominantly German Kreis Schwerin was almost evenly split among Germans and Poles.

Ethnolinguistic structure of Kreis Birnbaum
	Population	German		Polish / Bilingual / Other	
1900	27,586	13,313	48.3%	14,273	51.7%
1905	28,196	13,783	48.9%	14,413	51.1%
1910	28,887	14,069	48.7%	14,818	51.3%

== Police districts ==
In 1833 the office of a Wójt (Vogt, reeve) was established in the districts of the predominantly Polish-settled Grand Duchy of Posen, a voluntary administrator who often was a member of the local nobility. However, in the course of the Prussian Germanisation policies under Governor Eduard Heinrich von Flottwell, they were replaced by Prussian commissioners. In 1905, the municipalities in Kreis Birnbaum were governed within three police districts (Polizeidistrikte):

- Birnbaum
- Orzeschkowo
- Zirke

The administrative seats of Birnbaum and Zirke themselves were not incorporated.

== Court system ==
The district court (Landgericht) was in Meseritz, with the lower court (German: Amtsgericht) in Birnbaum.

== Civil registry offices ==
In 1905, these civil registry offices (Standesämter) served the following towns in Kreis Birnbaum:

- Birnbaum
- Kurnatowitze
- Lubosch
- Milostowo
- Orzeschkowo
- Zirke
- Groß Chrzypsko
- Radusch

== Catholic churches ==
In 1905, these Catholic parish churches served towns in Kreis Birnbaum:

- Birnbaum
- Biezdrowo
- Groß Chrzypsko
- Groß Luttom
- Kähme
- Kwiltsch
- Lubosch
- Psarskie
- Zirke
- Polikinpe
- Iliktrans
- Ritardinka

== Protestant churches ==
In 1905, Protestant parish churches served towns in Kreis Birnbaum:

- Altsorge
- Birnbaum
- Groß Chrzypsko
- Hauland
- Lewitz
- Milostowo
- Neuthal
- Orzeschkowo
- Radusch
- Pinne
- Zirke
