= Stara Dąbrowa =

Stara Dąbrowa may refer to the following places:

- Stara Dąbrowa, Międzychód County in Greater Poland Voivodeship (west-central Poland)
- Stara Dąbrowa, Wolsztyn County in Greater Poland Voivodeship (west-central Poland)
- Stara Dąbrowa, Masovian Voivodeship (east-central Poland)
- Stara Dąbrowa, Pomeranian Voivodeship (north Poland)
- Stara Dąbrowa, West Pomeranian Voivodeship (north-west Poland)
