= Nowa Dąbrowa =

Nowa Dąbrowa may refer to the following places:

- Nowa Dąbrowa, Międzychód County in Greater Poland Voivodeship (west-central Poland)
- Nowa Dąbrowa, Nowy Tomyśl County in Greater Poland Voivodeship (west-central Poland)
- Nowa Dąbrowa, Masovian Voivodeship (east-central Poland)
- Nowa Dąbrowa, Wolsztyn County in Greater Poland Voivodeship (west-central Poland)
- Nowa Dąbrowa, Pomeranian Voivodeship (north Poland)
- Nowa Dąbrowa, West Pomeranian Voivodeship (north-west Poland)
