= Głusk =

Głusk may refer to the following places in Poland:

- Głusk, a former village, now part of the city of Lublin
- Gmina Głusk, a district administered from Głusk (Lublin)
- Głusk, Masovian Voivodeship, a village in east-central Poland
- Hlusk, an urban-type settlement in Belarus
