= Transatlantyk Festival =

- Location: Łódź, (previously: Poznań Poland
- Website: http://transatlantyk.org/en

The Transatlantyk Festival (previously: Transatlantyk – Poznań; International Film and Music Festival) is an annual film festival held in Łódź (from 2011 to 2015 in Poznań and Rozbitek, Poland).

The founder and director of the festival is Polish composer and Oscar-winner Jan A. P. Kaczmarek. The position of Programming Director is held by Joanna Łapińska.

Transatlantyk poster (by Tomasz Opasiński) was among The Hollywood Reporter Key Art Awards finalists (in 2011) and Bronze Winners (in 2012 and in 2016).

== Sections ==
- Cinema: different sections (local and international movies, according to genres, problems and origin)
- Culinary Cinema (in cooperation with Berlinale Festival)
- Open-Air Cinema
- Workshops: Master Classes (lectures, seminars and workshops).
- Music events: music competitions events, concerts.

== Awards ==
- Transatlantyk Young Composer Award – for the best composer of the music for two short films.
- Transatlantyk Instant Composer Award – for the winner ("the composers will watch a short film clip and then will have to instantly compose a corresponding piano piece - all on stage while being watched by the audience. Those live improvisations will be judged by a jury").

Both of them are for composers who are not yet of 40 (35 in earlier editions) years of age.

- Glocal Hero Award – for "people of outstanding personalities, whose local and global activities shape the face of the modern world".

== Transatlantyk Audience Award ==
From the very first edition of Transatlantyk Festival, the audience have the privilege to award the best movie of the festival.

2011 – For Lovers Only, dir. Michael Polish

2012 – The House I Live In, dir. Eugene Jarecki

2013 – Paulette, dir. Jérôme Enrico

2014 – 20,000 Days on Earth, dir. Jane Pollard, Iain Forsyth

2015 – Slow West, dir. John Maclean

2016 – Viva, dir. Paddy Breathnach

== Transatlantyk Distribution Award ==
2017 – Aurore, dir. Blandine Lenoir

== International Transatlantyk Competition ==
2016 – Aquarius dir. Klebera Mendonca Filho; Golden Ark

2016 – Shavua ve Yom dir. Asaph Polonsky; distinction award

== Polish Short Films Competition ==
2016 – Dokument [Documentary] dir. Marcin Podolec

2016 – Love, love dir Grzegorz Zariczny

2017 – Bankiet, dir Julia Orlik

== Editions ==
- The first edition of the Festival took place between 5 and 13 August 2011.

Transatlantyk poster 2011

- Sections during the 1st edition:
  - Cinema: Transatlantyk Panorama, Transatlantyk Spotlight, Different America, 10 German Voices, Transatlantyk for Children, Transatlantyk Art, Miloš Forman Retrospective, Arab Revolutions: Before and Now, Season, Transatlantyk Docs, Transatlantyk Docs Wall Street Story, New Scandinavian Cinema, B Movies: "Passion and Nausea", Culture Passage,
  - Culinary Cinema (in cooperation with Berlinale Festival),
  - Open-Air Cinema,
  - Music Events: festival premieres of Jan A.P. Kaczmarek's "Yankiel’s Concerto" and "Open Window" (performed by Leszek Możdżer), concerts of: Belarusian cimbalom players "Wasilinki", Rozbitek Symphony Orchestra (conducted by Adam Banaszak), Silesian String Quartet (played Kaczmarek's string quartets, including the Polish premiere of quartets from Hisako Matsui's Japanese-American film "Leonie"), concert of Balanescu Quartet,
  - Master Classes (lectures, seminars and workshops): film music composition and production, Instant music composition (speaking the language of music in real-time), film production, video arts, computer animation, graphics and design, script writing, the art of acting.

The Glocal Hero Award: Bjørn Lomborg (a Danish academic and environmental writer).

- The second edition of the Festival took place from 15–22 August 2012.

Transatlantyk poster 2012

- Sections during the 2nd edition:
  - Cinema: Transatlantyk Eko, Transatlantyk Docs 2012, Wall Street Story, Transatlantyk Panorama, Transatlantyk Confrontations, New German Cinema, New Scandinavian Cinema, Arab Revolution: Before and Now, Alfred Hitchcock: Retrospective, B Movies, Bike Movies, Transatlantyk Art, New Polish Documentary, Beyond the Genre: Science-Fiction, Transatlantyk Season, Oscar 2012 Foreign Languages Nominees, Transatlantyk for Children.
  - Culinary Cinema (in cooperation with Berlinale Festival),
  - Open-Air Cinema: Baltic (first 50 Bed Open Air Cinema),
  - Music Events,
  - Theater events,
  - Master Classes (lectures, seminars and workshops).

The Glocal Hero Award: Elżbieta and Krzysztof Penderecki (a Polish composer and conductor).

- The third edition of the Festival took place from 2–9 August 2013.

Transatlantyk poster 2013

- Sections during the 3rd edition:
  - Cinema: Transatlantyk Panorama, Sundance at Transatlantyk, New German Cinema, Cinematic Journey of the Master - Stanley Kubrick, New Scandinavian Cinema, Road Movies - "Skoda Recommends!", Mobile Cinema Skoda, Oscar 2013 - Nominees for Best Documentary Features, Transatlantyk Docs, Transatlantyk Eco, Transatlantyk Art, Sacrum in Cinema, Transatlantyk Confrontations, Bike Movies, Season, Special Screenings, Beyond the Genre: Superhero, B Movies, Transatlantyk for Children,
  - Culinary Cinema (in cooperation with Berlinale Festival),
  - Open-Air Cinema at Plac Wolności,
  - Music Events (Yoko Ono and Thurston Moore, 35th Anniversary of Varèse Sarabande),
  - Master Classes (lectures, seminars and workshops).

The Glocal Hero Award: Yoko Ono.

- The fourth edition of the festival took place from 7 to 15 August 2014
  - Cinema: Nivea Screenings for Mothers, B Movies, Culinary Cinema, Cinema in Bed, Transatlantyk Sport, Mobilne Skoda Cinema, Oscars 2014 - the best of, Retrospective of Charles Chaplin, Season, Sundance on Transatlantyku, Transatlantyk for Children Transatlantyk Docs, Transatlantyk Eco Inspired By Aquanet, Transatlantyk Confrontations, Transatlantyk Panorama
  - Transatlantyk Glocal Hero Award - Gayatri Chakravorty Spivak
  - Transatlantyk Film Music Competition - Moritz Schmittat (Germiany)
  - Transatlantyk Instant Composition Contest - Mateusz Dębski (Poland).
  - Guests: Justin Chatwin, John Ottman, Allan Starski, Bruce Broughton, Michael Price, Jóhann Jóhannsson, Sydney Freeland, Amelia Green-Dove, Lech Majewski, Rosław Szaybo, Grażyna Szapołowska, Arkadiusz Jakubik, Lidia Popiel, Bogusław Linda, Jacek Braciak, Katarzyna Herman, Wojciech Eichelberger, Barbara Sikorska-Bouffał, Katarzyna Lewińska among others
  - The Festival was visited by about 60 000 people
- The fifth edition of the festival took place from 7–14 August 2015
  - Cinema: Culinary Cinema, Skoda Mobile Cinema, Season, Transatlantyk Docs, Transatlantyk Confrontations, Transatlantyk Panorama, Special Screenings, Retrospecive: Gaumont, Oscars 2015, Transatlantyk Sport, Cinema in Bed, Transatlantyk Independent Cinema, Transatlantyk Sacrum, Transatlantyk Eco, B-Movie: Body Horror, Children Cinema.
  - Cinema in Bed: the project evolve in Łóżkoteka and was not only dedicated to the screenings but includes also the lectures, lunches, photographic sessions among other activities
  - Transatlantyk Film Music Competition - Andrea Grant (Italy)
  - Transatlantyk Instant Composition Contest - Aleksandra Chmielewska (Poland)
  - Guests.: Joe Pantoliano, John Debney, Curt Sobel, Hisako Matsui, Simon Curtis, Shaune Harrison, Frank Ilfman, Jonh Maclean, Kathleen Davison, Paweł Potoroczyn, Magnus von Horn, Joanna Kulig, Maciej Bochniak, Ewa Puszczyńska, Andrzej Maleszka, Stanisław Tyczyński, Mariusz Grzegorzek, Krzysztof Gierat, Rafał Królikowski, Karolina Bielawska, Marcin Prokop, Piotr Metz, Wiesław Kot, Jarosław Barzan, Radosław Ładczuk.
  - The edition was visited by 65 000 people
- The sixth edition of the festival took place from 23–30 June 2016 and their main topic was dedicated to the refugee crisis.
- Cinema: Culinary Cinema, B-Movies, Rossmann Cinema for Parents, Rossmann Children Cinema, Season, Transatlantyk Sacrum, Oscars 2016, Transatlantyk Independent Cinema, Transatlantyk Docs, Transatlantyk Art, Transatlantyk Confrontations, Transatlantyk Panorama, ECO, Other America, Sergio Leone Retrospective
- 176 movies was screened
- International Transatlantyk Competition – "Aquarius" dir. Klebera Mendonci Filho
- Transatlantyk Audience Award 2016 – "Viva" dir. Paddy Breathnacha
- Guests:: Irène Jacob, Richard N.Gladstein (Oscar - nominee producer of Pulp Fiction), Dan Lebental (Iron Man i Ant-Man), Keith David (Requiem dla snu), Morgan Saylor(ang.) (Homeland), Will Allen (Holly Hell); composers: Roque Baños (Oldboy), Daniel Pemberton (Steve Jobs, U.N.C.L.E.).

For the first time during the Transatlantyk Festival, the virtual reality movies was presented.

=== 2017 edition ===
- The seventh edition took place from 14 to 21 July in Łódź and the main topic was dedicated to the Power of Woman
- The film programme included hundreds of movie screenings, 55 movies were Polish premieres.
- Movie sections: Panorama, Docs, Polish Short Films Competition, Stories of Cinema - How do Masters Began, Close-Up - Lucrecia Martel, Close-Up - Edward Norton, Close-Up - Barbara Sass, Culinary Cinema prepared with the cooperation with Berlinale Film Festival, B-Class Cinema and Madness, Cinema in Bed, Summer Film Festival Girl Power, Season, Little Rascal Club, Breakfast with Transatlantyk, VR Movies.
- Edward Norton, the American actor was awarded by Transatlantic Glocal Hero Award for his activity for shaping locally and globally the modern world. The prestige award of FIPRESCI 92 from the International Federation of Film Critics was given to Lucrecia Martel for the first time in Poland.
- Transatlantyk Distribution Award was given by the audience of the festival to the Blandine Lenoir and her movie "Aurore", Young Critics Award went to for Hubert Charuel for his debut movie. The second edition of Polish Short Competition was won by Julia Orlik and her animation "Banquet".
- Master Classes were held by the prominent representatives of the film industry such as Micheal Seresin (cinematographer, "Harry Potter"), Anne Sophie-Bion (editor, "The Artist"), Edward Norton (actor, "Fight Club", "25th Hour"), Lucrecia Martel (director). The guests of the festival were: Philippe Mora, Trevor Graham ("Monsieur Mayonnaise"), Andrzej Seweryn, Jan P. Matuszyński ("The Last Family"), Janusz Majewski, Wojciech Karolak, Krzysztof Sadowski ("Jazz in Poland"), Magdalena Cielecka ("Pokuszenie"), Dorota Stalińska ("Krzyk") czy Greg Zgliński ("Animals") among others.

Transatlantyk begins with the Great Women Reading - the music&literally event with the music composed by Jan A.P. Kaczmarek and accompanied by HollyŁódź Film Orchestra, Vivid Singers Choir and conducted by Monika Wolińska. During the event, the best Polish actress was reading on the scene the most famous texts written by Simone de Beauvoir, Doris Lessing or Patti Smith.

- International movie composition contest: Transatlantyk Film Music Competition™ (FMC) - the winner was Ruslan Perezhilo (Latvia).
- Instant (improvisational) film scoring competition: Transatlantyk Instant Composition Contest™ (TICC) - the winner was Jakub Czerski (Poland).
- For the first time in the history of the festival, the industry workshops Lodołamacz took place. The main theme was film distribution.
