= Nowa Mała Wieś =

- Village
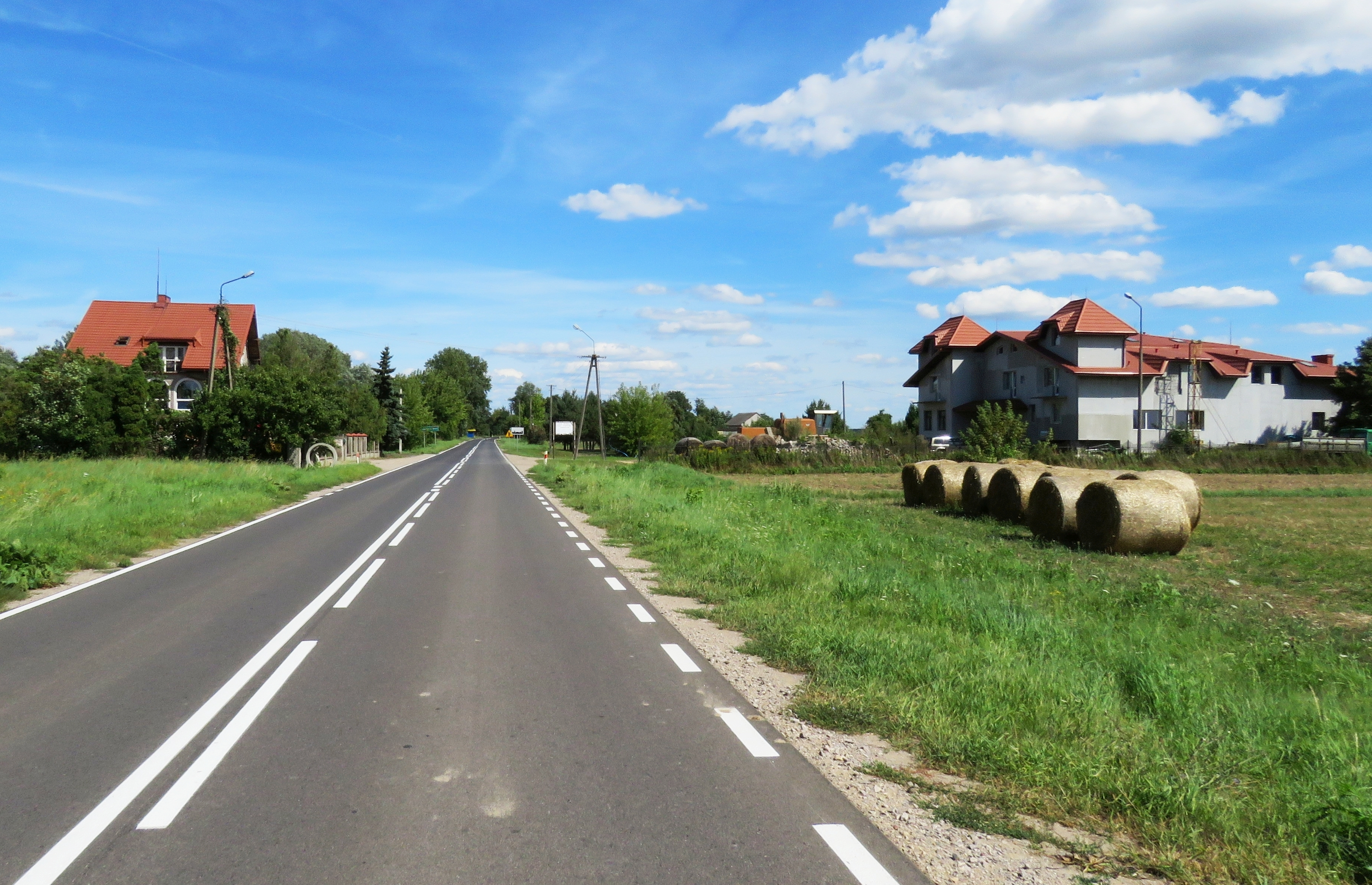
- Road in Nowa Mała Wieś

- Location within Poland
- Coordinates: 52°24′50″N 20°33′59″E
- Country: Poland
- Voivodeship: Masovian
- County: Nowy Dwór
- Gmina: Leoncin

Nowa Mała Wieś [ˈnɔva ˈmawa ˈvjɛɕ] is a village in the administrative district of Gmina Leoncin, within Nowy Dwór County, Masovian Voivodeship, in east-central Poland.

Village had population of 192 in 2012, which show migration -1, from 2001 - 193.

In the village exists at least one wooden house, which is material remain on the activities of the Dutchman immigration to Poland. Nearby located is voivodeship road, number 575.
