= Gniewniewice Folwarczne =

- Village
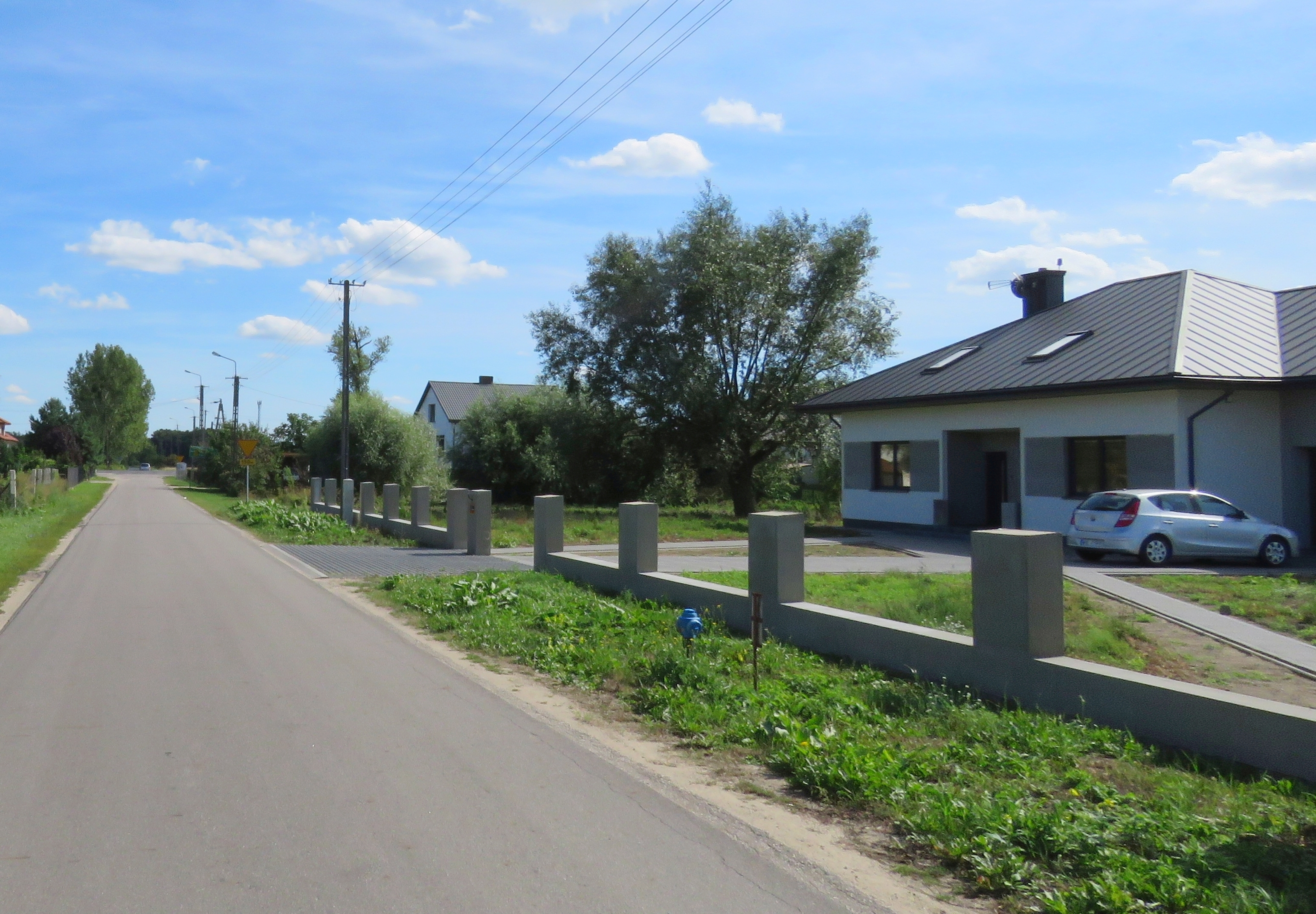
- Roadside home in Gniewniewice Folwarczne

- Flag Coat of arms

- Location within Poland
- Coordinates: 52°24′N 20°31′E
- Country: Poland
- Voivodeship: Masovian
- County: Nowy Dwór
- Gmina: Leoncin

Gniewniewice Folwarczne [ɡɲɛvɲɛˈvit͡sɛ fɔlˈvart͡ʂnɛ] is a village in the administrative district of Gmina Leoncin, within Nowy Dwór County, Masovian Voivodeship, in east-central Poland.
