= Nowe Grochale =

- Village
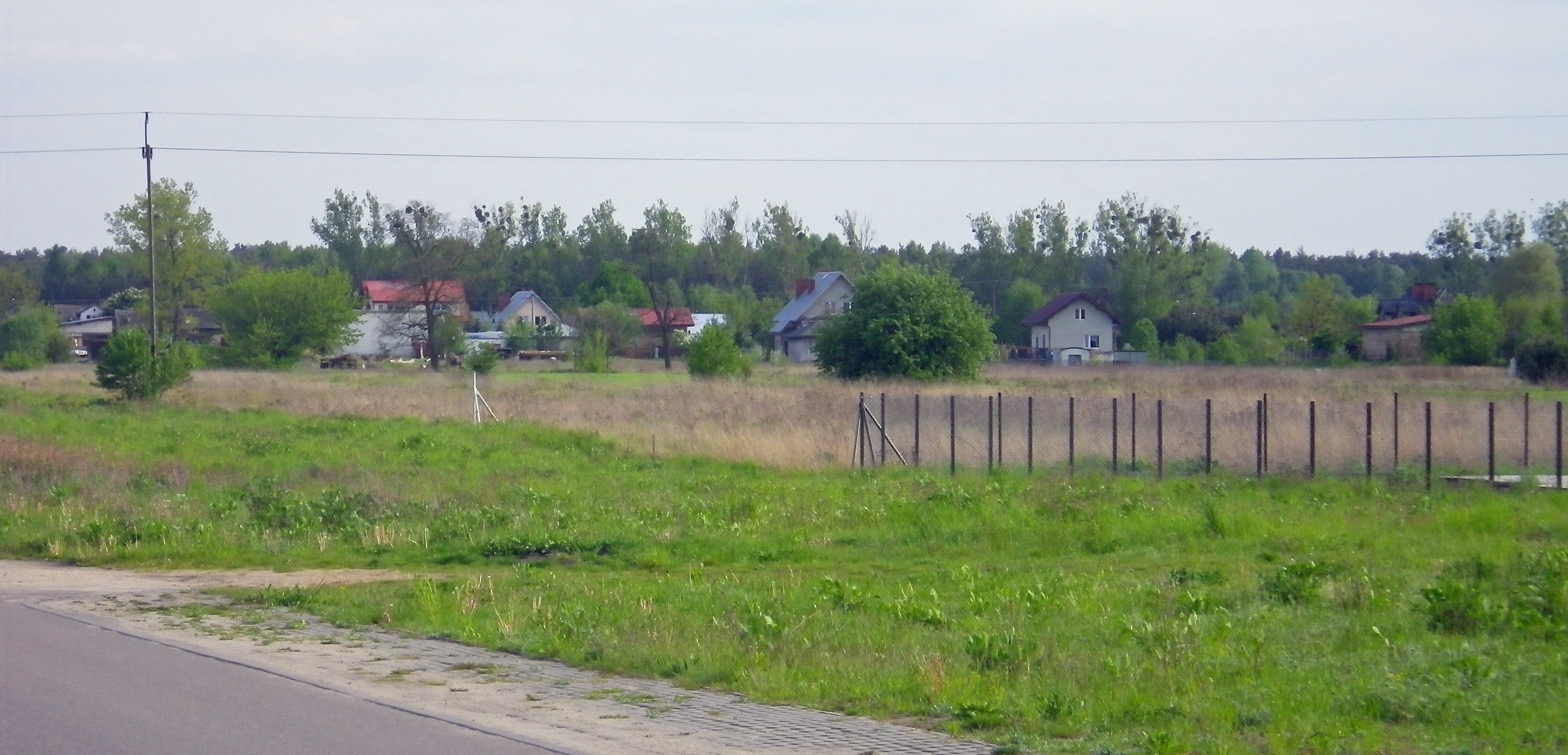
- Southern part of Nowe Grochale (2015)

- Location within Poland
- Coordinates: 52°24′N 20°35′E
- Country: Poland
- Voivodeship: Masovian
- County: Nowy Dwór
- Gmina: Leoncin
- Population: 740

Nowe Grochale [ˈnɔvɛ ɡrɔˈxalɛ] is a village in the administrative district of Gmina Leoncin, within Nowy Dwór County, Masovian Voivodeship, in east-central Poland.

The village was colonized by the Dutch settlers, most likely, in the first half of the 19th century at the same time as the neighboring areas. Nowe Grochale is a linear village situated along the southern riverbed of the Vistula, to the north-east of Leoncin. The village stretches along an east-west line by the Kazuń-Kamion road.

The traditional Dutch cultural landscape has been completely transformed. There are no historical objects characteristic of this colonization. New buildings have been erected starting in 1980s and 1990s; their location does not follow the traditional arrangements of fields and homesteads. The last historical object dating from 1920 was taken down in 1988. It was built of wood and had a corner-notched log structure covered with a rafter-collar beam, straw thatched roof. The building included a residential section and a cowshed under one roof.
