= Gmina Kwilcz =

Gmina in Greater Poland Voivodeship, Poland

Gmina Kwilcz Kwilcz Commune
- Gmina
- Flag Coat of arms

- Location within Poland
- Coordinates (Kwilcz): 52°33′13″N 16°5′5″E
- Country: Poland
- Voivodeship: Greater Poland
- County: Międzychód
- Seat: Kwilcz

Area
  - Total: 141.78 km^{2} (54.74 sq mi)

Population (2011)
  - Total: 6,289
  - Density: 44.36/km^{2} (114.9/sq mi)
- Website: www.kwilcz.pl

Gmina Kwilcz is a rural gmina (administrative district) in Międzychód County, Greater Poland Voivodeship, in west-central Poland. Its seat is the village of Kwilcz, which lies approximately 15 kilometres (9 mi) east of Międzychód and 59 km (37 mi) west of the regional capital Poznań.

The gmina covers an area of 141.78 square kilometres (54.7 sq mi), and as of 2009 its total population is 6,153.

== Villages ==
Gmina Kwilcz contains the villages and settlements of Augustowo, Chorzewo, Chudobczyce, Dąbrówka, Daleszynek, Józefowo, Karolewice, Kozubówka, Kubowo, Kurnatowice, Kwilcz, Leśnik, Lubosz, Mechnacz, Miłostowo, Mościejewo, Niemierzewo, Nowa Dąbrowa, Nowy Młyn, Orzeszkowo, Pólko, Prusim, Rozbitek, Stara Dąbrowa, Stary Młyn, Upartowo, Urbanówko and Wituchowo.

== Neighbouring gminas ==
Gmina Kwilcz is bordered by the gminas of Chrzypsko Wielkie, Lwówek, Międzychód, Pniewy and Sieraków.
