= Nowy Secymin =

- Village
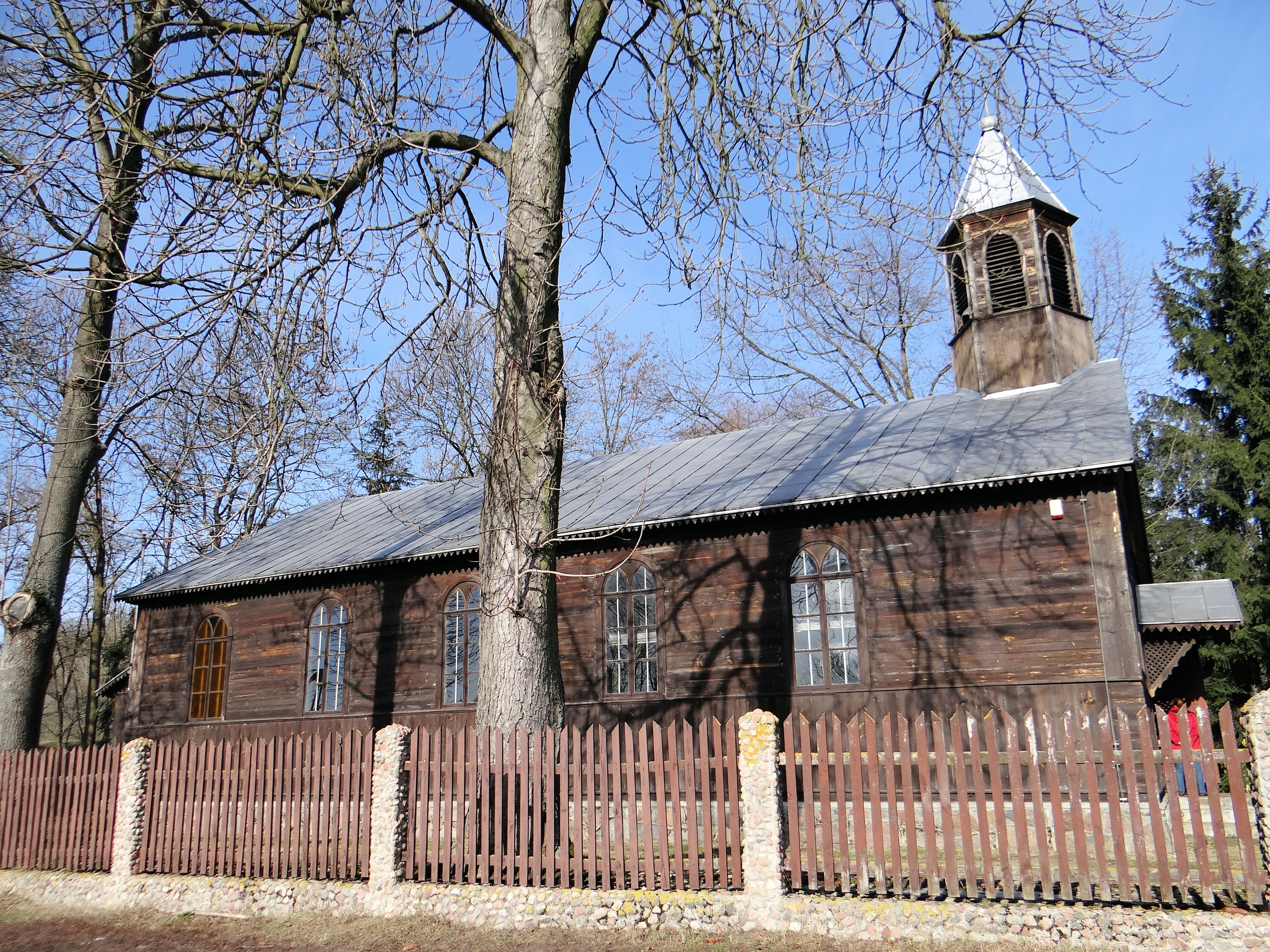
- The Blessed Virgin Mary Church in Nowy Secymin

- Location within Poland
- Coordinates: 52°23′04″N 20°25′23″E
- Country: Poland
- Voivodeship: Masovian
- County: Nowy Dwór
- Gmina: Leoncin

Nowy Secymin [ˈnɔvɨ sɛˈt͡sɨmin] (German Deutsch Secymin) is a village in the administrative district of Gmina Leoncin, within Nowy Dwór County, Masovian Voivodeship, in east-central Poland. According to the 2011 Polish census, it has a population of 129.
