= Ośniki =

- Village
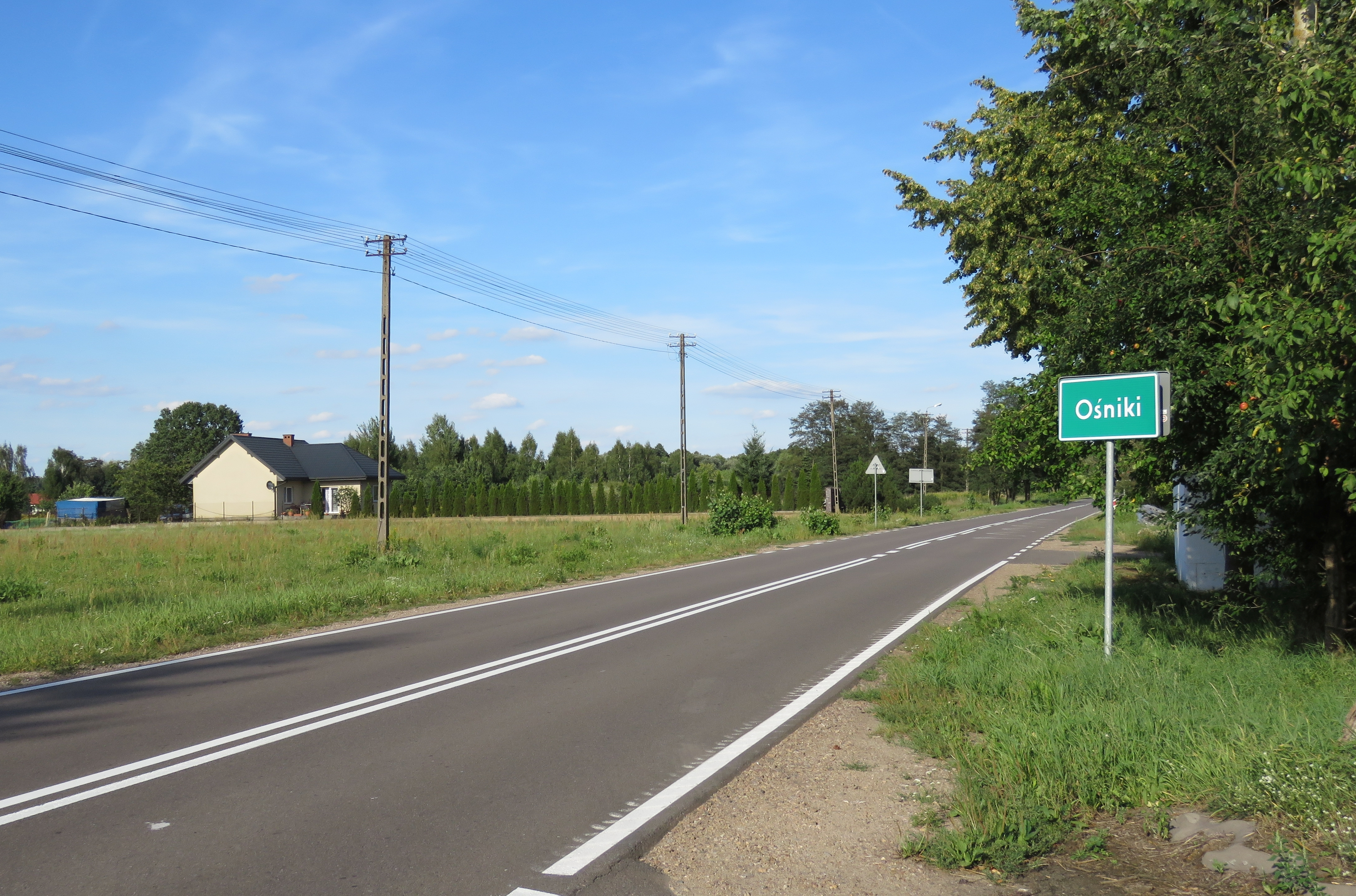
- Road sign in Ośniki

- Location within Poland
- Coordinates: 52°23′12″N 20°28′13″E
- Country: Poland
- Voivodeship: Masovian
- County: Nowy Dwór
- Gmina: Leoncin

Ośniki [ɔɕˈniki] is a village in the administrative district of Gmina Leoncin, within Nowy Dwór County, Masovian Voivodeship, in east-central Poland.
