= Mała Wieś przy Drodze =

- Village
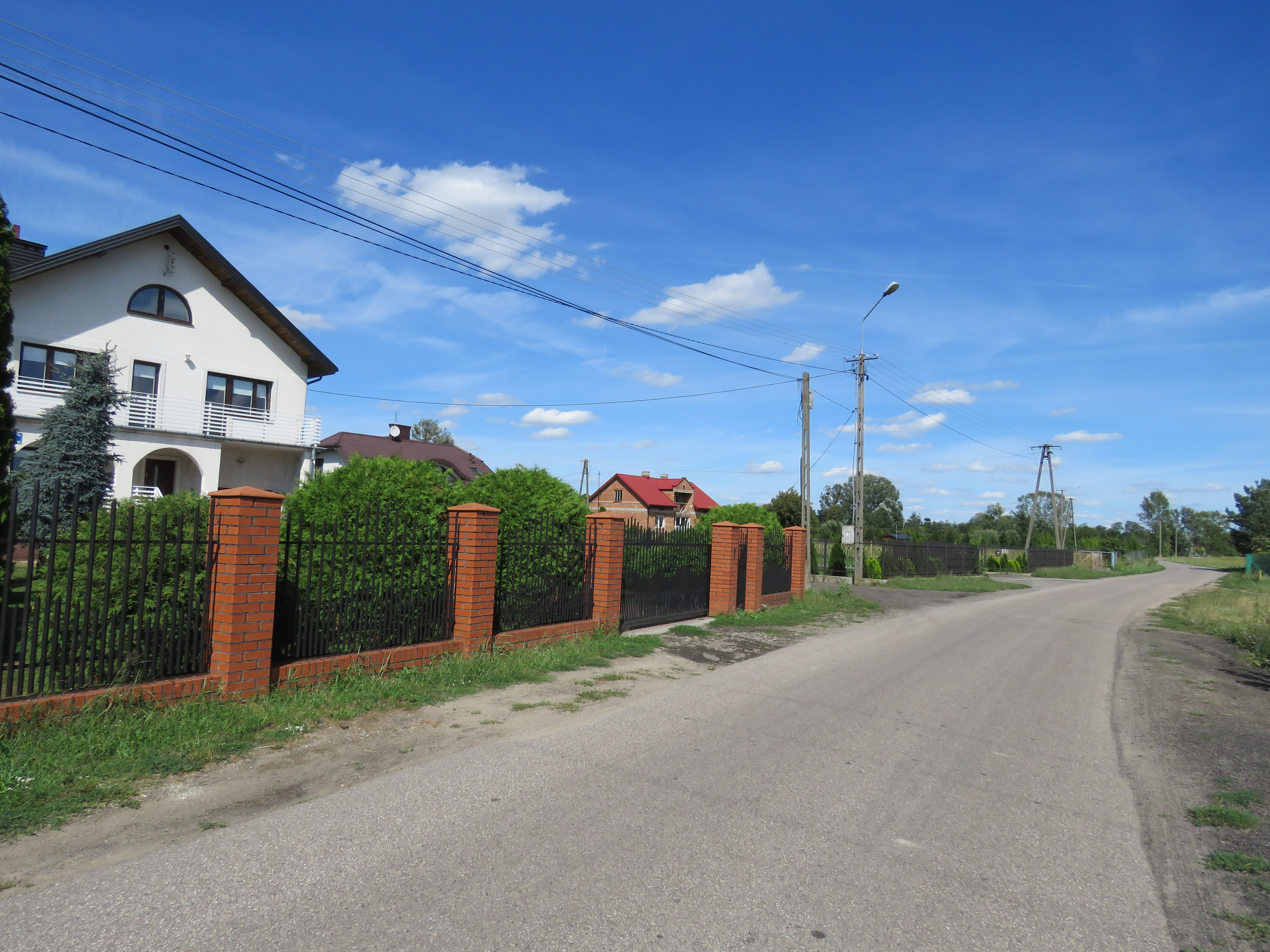
- Street of Mała Wieś przy Drodze

- Location within Poland
- Coordinates: 52°25′11″N 20°32′40″E
- Country: Poland
- Voivodeship: Masovian Voivodeship
- County: Nowy Dwór
- Gmina: Leoncin

Mała Wieś przy Drodze [ˈmawa ˈvʲɛɕ ˈpʂɨ ˈdrɔd͡zɛ] (literal translation: "Small Village by the Road") is a village in the administrative district of Gmina Leoncin, within Nowy Dwór County, Masovian Voivodeship, in east-central Poland.
