= Secyminek =

- Village
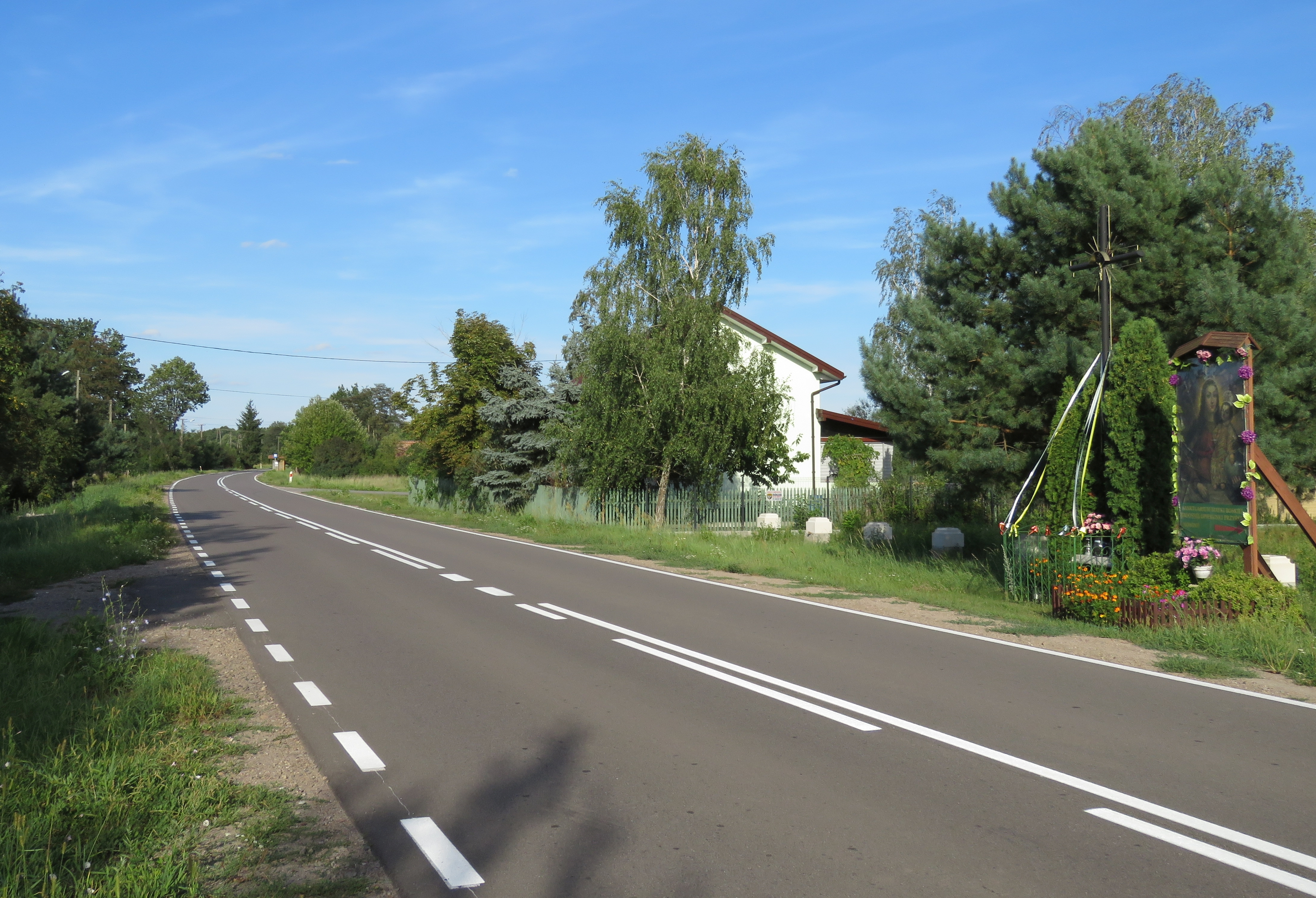
- Street of Secyminek

- Location within Poland
- Coordinates: 52°23′18″N 20°27′39″E
- Country: Poland
- Voivodeship: Masovian
- County: Nowy Dwór
- Gmina: Leoncin

Secyminek [sɛt͡sɨˈminɛk] is a village in the administrative district of Gmina Leoncin, within Nowy Dwór County, Masovian Voivodeship, in east-central Poland.
