= Prusim, Greater Poland Voivodeship =

Prusim
- Village
- Location within Poland
- Coordinates: 52°35′N 16°1′E
- Country: Poland
- Voivodeship: Greater Poland
- County: Międzychód
- Gmina: Kwilcz

Prusim [ˈpruɕim] is a village in the administrative district of Gmina Kwilcz, within Międzychód County, Greater Poland Voivodeship, in west-central Poland.
