= Leśnik, Międzychód County =

Polish village

Leśnik
- Village
- Location within Poland
- Coordinates: 52°34′03″N 16°06′10″E
- Country: Poland
- Voivodeship: Greater Poland
- County: Międzychód
- Gmina: Kwilcz

Leśnik [ˈlɛɕnik] is a village in the administrative district of Gmina Kwilcz, within Międzychód County, Greater Poland Voivodeship, in west-central Poland.
