= Leoncin =

- Village
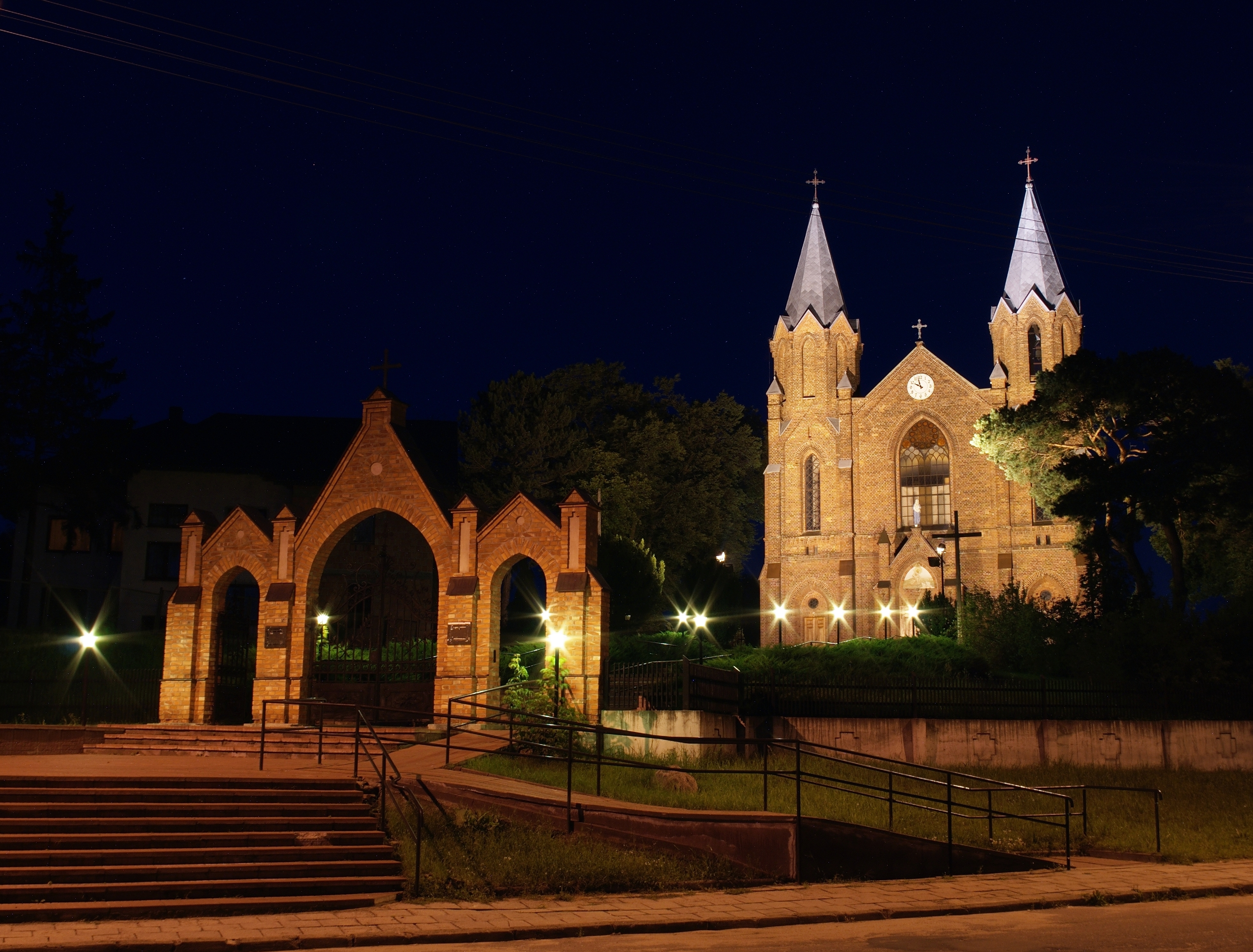
- Neogothic St. Margaret's Church

- Location within Poland
- Coordinates: 52°24′N 20°33′E
- Country: Poland
- Voivodeship: Masovian
- County: Nowy Dwór
- Gmina: Leoncin

Leoncin pronounced [lɛˈɔnt͡ɕin] is a village in Nowy Dwór County, Masovian Voivodeship, in east-central Poland. It is the seat of the gmina (administrative district) called Gmina Leoncin.

Leoncin is approximately 40 kilometres (25 mi) north-west of Warsaw. It has a neogothic church from 1885, as well as a wooden chapel dating from the end of the 18th century that is located at a nearby cemetery. It is also famous for being the birthplace of Isaac Bashevis Singer.

== 20th century ==
The Jewish community of Leoncin during the partitions of Poland was relatively small, totalling about 30 business families, some cultivating orchards, others running taverns or involved in manufacture. Isaac Bashevis Singer was born in Leoncin circa 1903, and lived in the village with his father, Pinchas, mother Bathsheba, brothers Israel Joshua Singer and Moishe, and sister Esther Kreitman. Twin sisters were also born here in 1902, but died of scarlet fever in 1906, the same year the family moved to Radzymin.

Jews were expelled by the Russians during World War I. Only seven of them were allowed to bring their personal possessions thanks to a protest by a New York rabbi, others were not. The Jews returned to Leoncin after the rebirth of sovereign Poland. In 1921, there were 149 Polish Jews in the village according to the census, some 51.7 percent of the population. In the following years, due in part to economic difficulties as well as Zionist agitation, many left in search of greener pastures. During the Holocaust in occupied Poland, in the winter of 1940–41 the remaining Jewish inhabitants of Leoncin were deported by German forces to a transit ghetto in Nowy Dwór Mazowiecki and from there to extermination camps.
