= Rybitew =

- Village
- Location within Poland
- Coordinates: 52°23′N 20°35′E
- Country: Poland
- Voivodeship: Masovian
- County: Nowy Dwór
- Gmina: Leoncin

Rybitew [rɨˈbitɛf] is a village in the administrative district of Gmina Leoncin, within Nowy Dwór County, Masovian Voivodeship, in east-central Poland.
