= Stare Polesie =

- Village
- Location within Poland
- Coordinates: 52°22′11″N 20°27′32″E
- Country: Poland
- Voivodeship: Masovian
- County: Nowy Dwór
- Gmina: Leoncin

Stare Polesie [ˈstarɛ pɔˈlɛɕɛ] is a village in the administrative district of Gmina Leoncin, within Nowy Dwór County, Masovian Voivodeship, in east-central Poland.
