= Pólko, Międzychód County =

Pólko
- Village
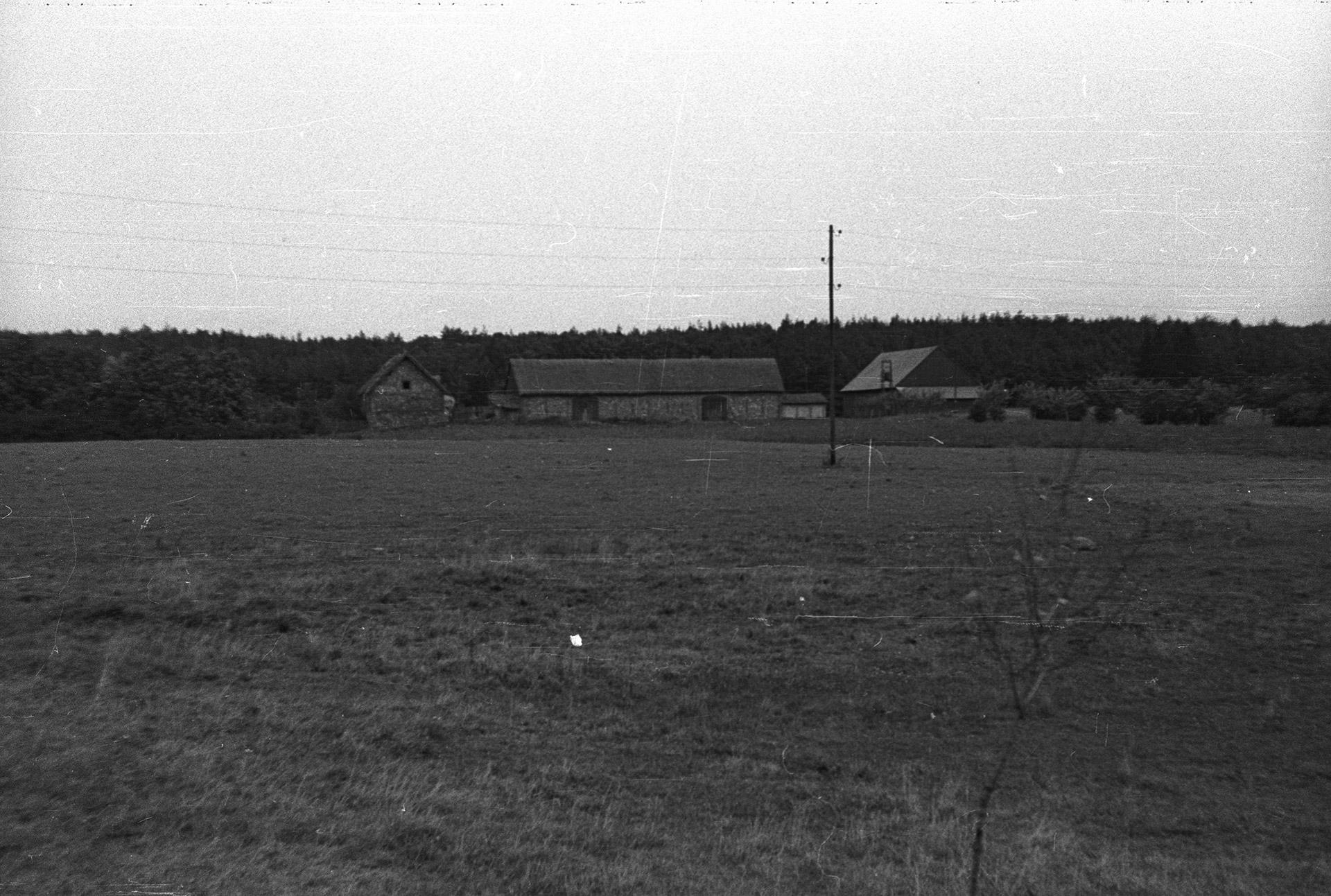
- Pólko in 1957

- Location within Poland
- Coordinates: 52°32′37″N 16°07′48″E
- Country: Poland
- Voivodeship: Greater Poland
- County: Międzychód
- Gmina: Kwilcz

Pólko [ˈpulkɔ] is a village in the administrative district of Gmina Kwilcz, within Międzychód County, Greater Poland Voivodeship, in west-central Poland.
