= Nowe Polesie =

- Village
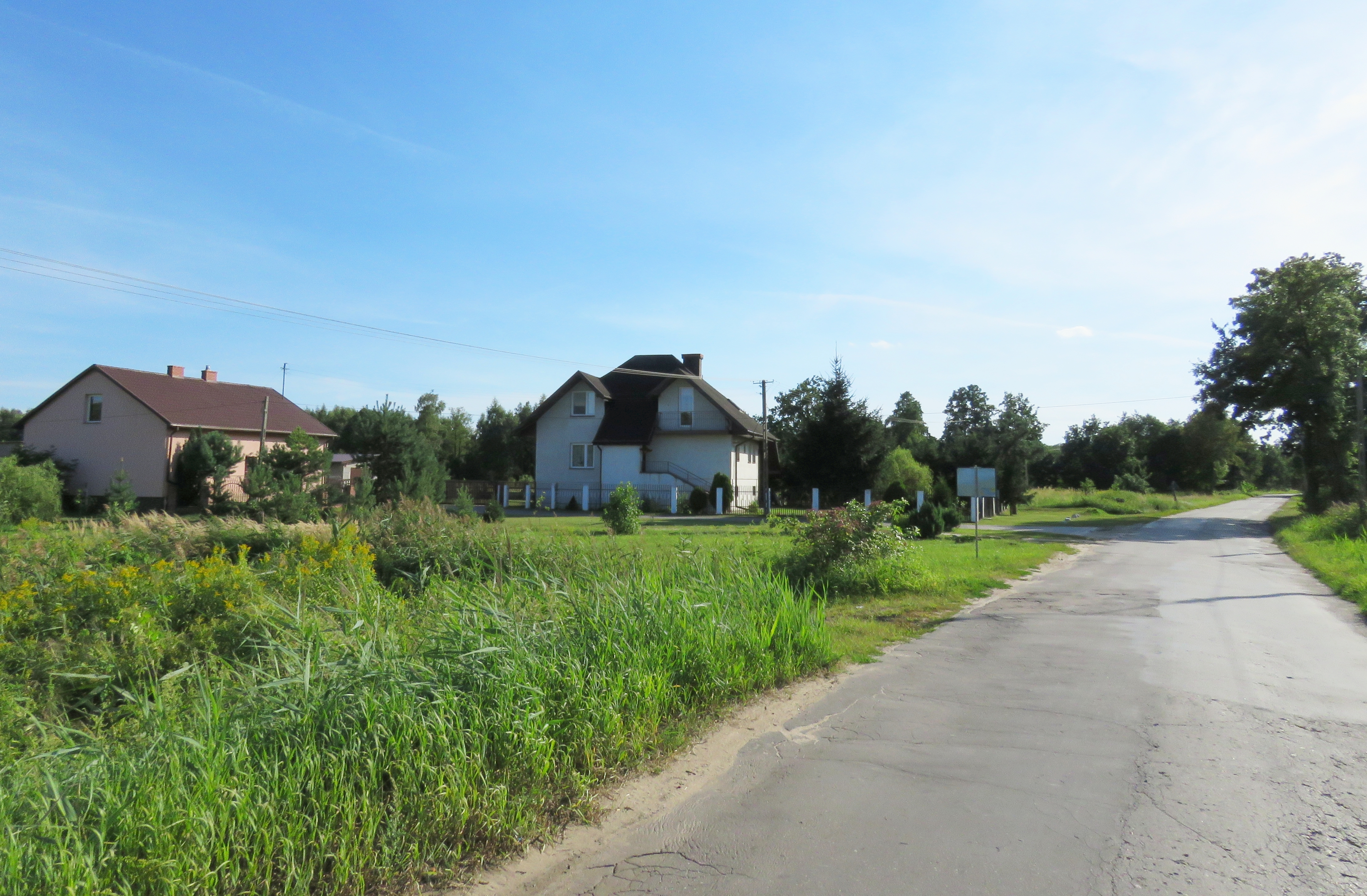

- Location within Poland
- Coordinates: 52°22′10″N 20°29′13″E
- Country: Poland
- Voivodeship: Masovian
- County: Nowy Dwór
- Gmina: Leoncin

Nowe Polesie [ˈnɔvɛ pɔˈlɛɕɛ] is a village in the administrative district of Gmina Leoncin, within Nowy Dwór County, Masovian Voivodeship, in east-central Poland.
