= Stary Młyn, Greater Poland Voivodeship =

Stary Młyn
- Village
- Location within Poland
- Coordinates: 52°34′00″N 16°05′59″E
- Country: Poland
- Voivodeship: Greater Poland
- County: Międzychód
- Gmina: Kwilcz

Stary Młyn [ˈstarɨ ˈmwɨn] is a village in the administrative district of Gmina Kwilcz, within Międzychód County, Greater Poland Voivodeship, in west-central Poland.
