= Upartowo =

- Village
- Location within Poland
- Coordinates: 52°36′N 16°6′E
- Country: Poland
- Voivodeship: Greater Poland
- County: Międzychód
- Gmina: Kwilcz

Upartowo [uparˈtɔvɔ] is a village in the administrative district of Gmina Kwilcz, within Międzychód County, Greater Poland Voivodeship, in west-central Poland.
