= Gać, Masovian Voivodeship =

Gać
- Village
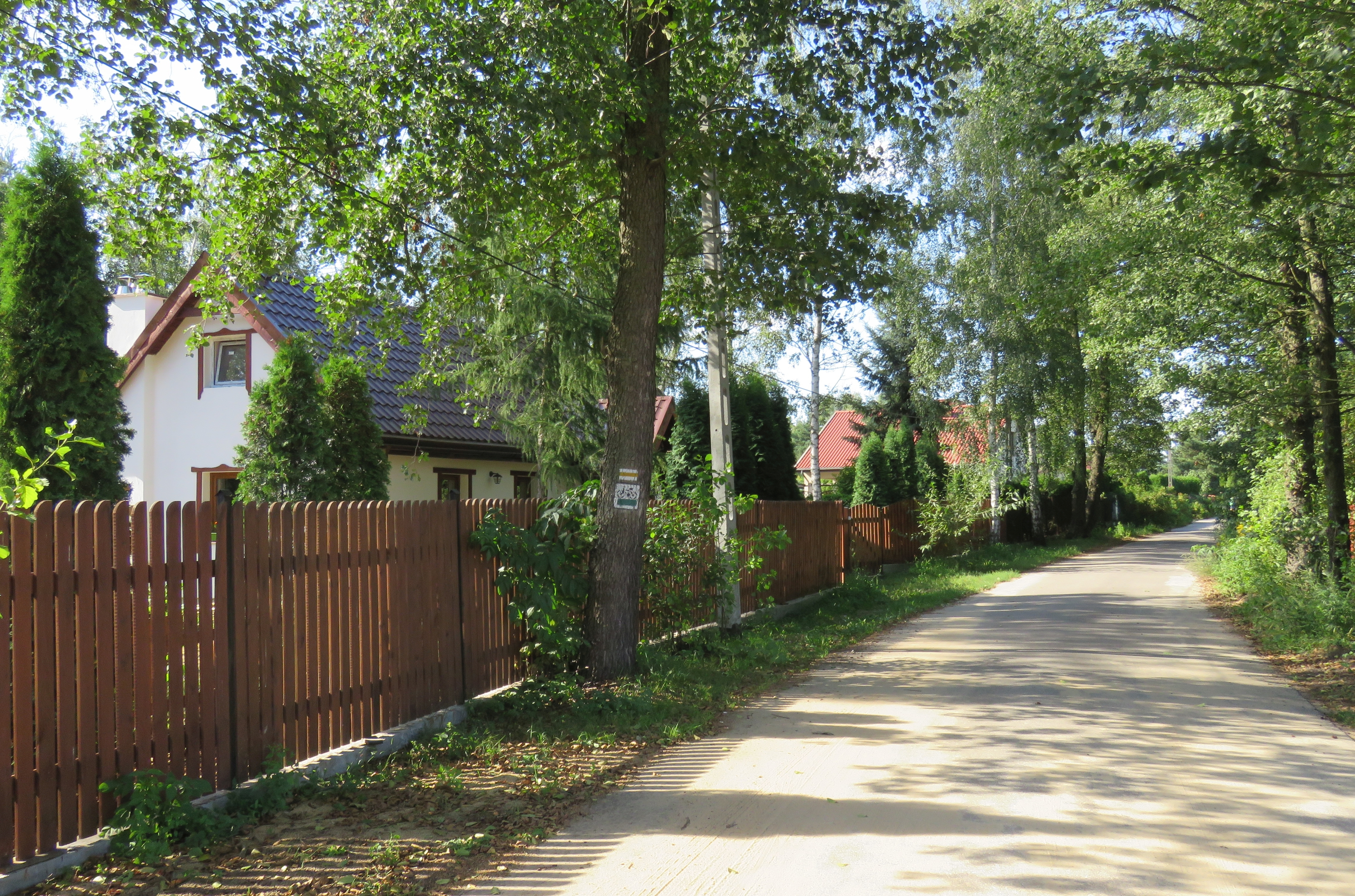

- Location within Poland
- Coordinates: 52°23′N 20°34′E
- Country: Poland
- Voivodeship: Masovian
- County: Nowy Dwór
- Gmina: Leoncin
- Time zone: UTC+1 (CET)
  - Summer (DST): UTC+2 (CEST)
- Postal code: 05-155
- Vehicle registration: WND

Gać (Polish pronunciation: [ɡat͡ɕ]) is a village in the administrative district of Gmina Leoncin, within Nowy Dwór County, Masovian Voivodeship, in east-central Poland.
