= Chudobczyce =

- Village
- Location within Poland
- Coordinates: 52°30′N 16°11′E
- Country: Poland
- Voivodeship: Greater Poland
- County: Międzychód
- Gmina: Kwilcz

Chudobczyce [xudɔpˈt͡ʂɨt͡sɛ] is a village in the administrative district of Gmina Kwilcz, within Międzychód County, Greater Poland Voivodeship, in west-central Poland.
