= Wincentówek, Masovian Voivodeship =

Wincentówek
- Village
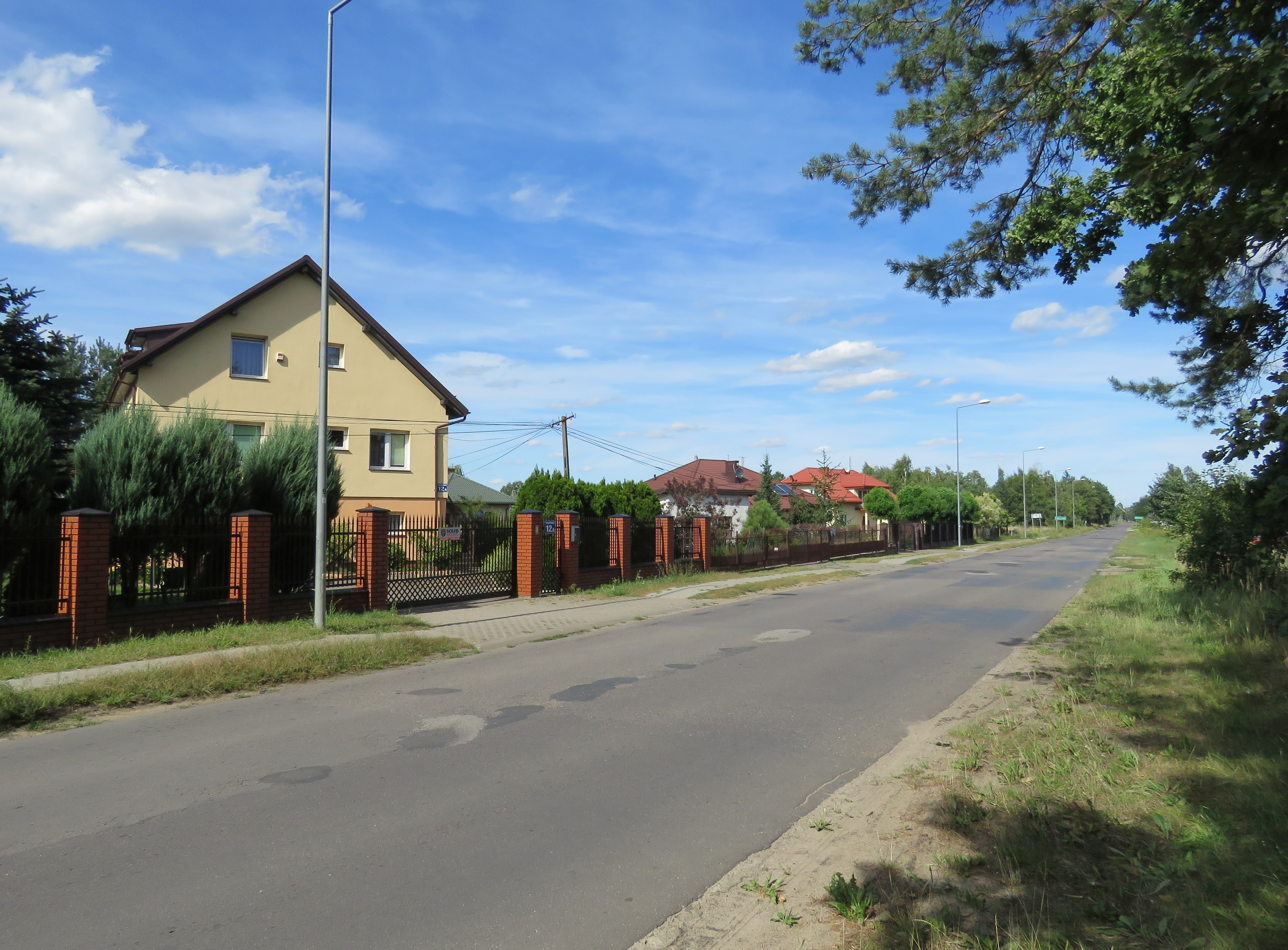

- Location within Poland
- Coordinates: 52°23′38″N 20°32′45″E
- Country: Poland
- Voivodeship: Masovian
- County: Nowy Dwór
- Gmina: Leoncin

Wincentówek [vint͡sɛnˈtuvɛk] is a village in the administrative district of Gmina Leoncin, within Nowy Dwór County, Masovian Voivodeship, in east-central Poland.
