= Wilków nad Wisłą =

- Village
- Location within Poland
- Coordinates: 52°24′14″N 20°28′38″E
- Country: Poland
- Voivodeship: Masovian
- County: Nowy Dwór
- Gmina: Leoncin

Wilków nad Wisłą [ˈvilkuf ˌnad ˈviswɔ̃] is a village in the administrative district of Gmina Leoncin, within Nowy Dwór County, Masovian Voivodeship, in east-central Poland.
