= Józefowo, Międzychód County =

Józefowo
- Village
- Location within Poland
- Coordinates: 52°33′12″N 16°9′18″E
- Country: Poland
- Voivodeship: Greater Poland
- County: Międzychód
- Gmina: Kwilcz

Józefowo (Polish pronunciation: [juzɛˈfɔvɔ]; German: Josefowo) is a village in the administrative district of Gmina Kwilcz, within Międzychód County, Greater Poland Voivodeship, in west-central Poland.
