= Nowy Wilków =

- Village
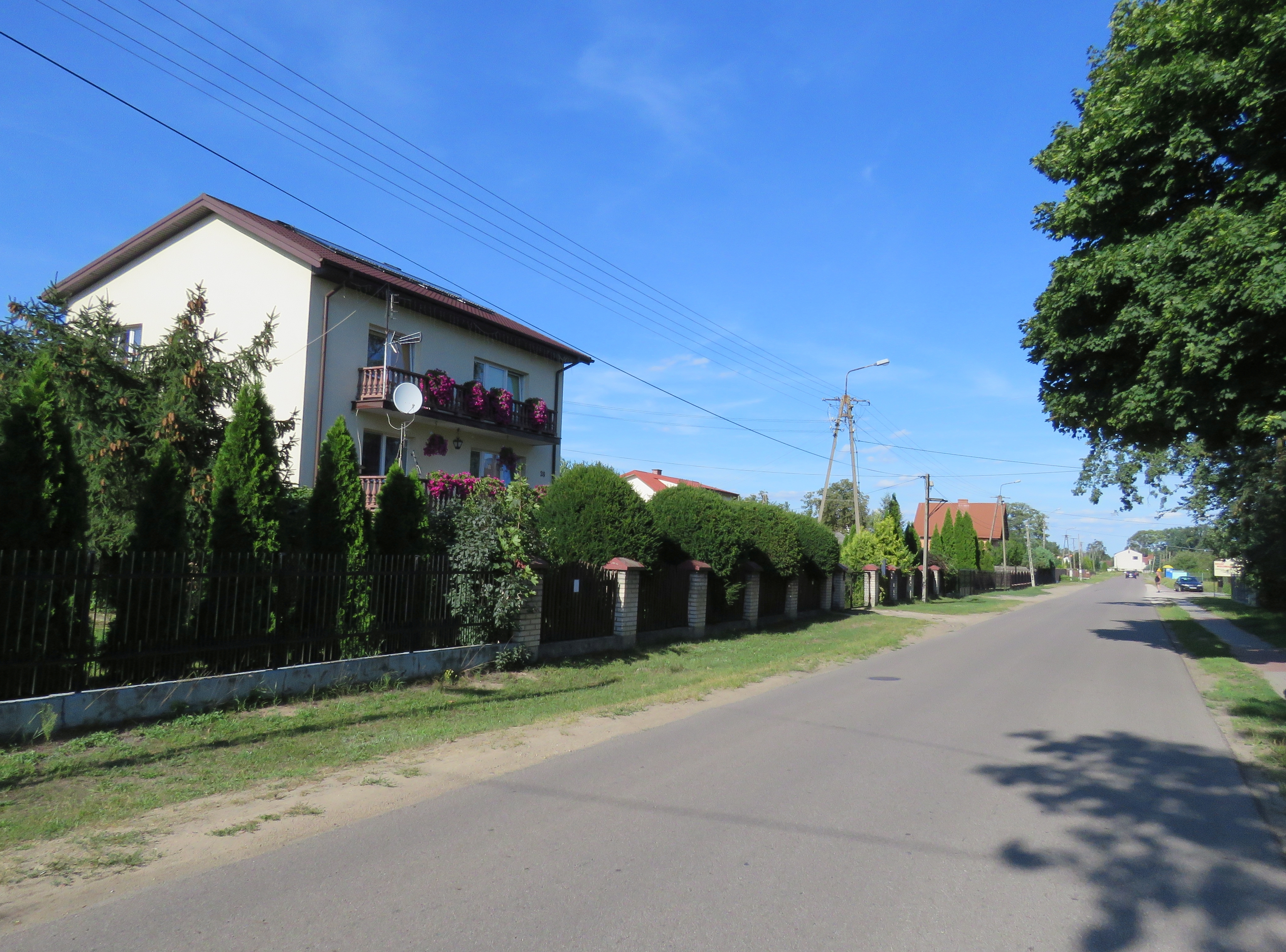
- Street of Nowy Wilków

- Location within Poland
- Coordinates: 52°23′02″N 20°30′28″E
- Country: Poland
- Voivodeship: Masovian
- County: Nowy Dwór
- Gmina: Leoncin

Nowy Wilków [ˈnɔvɨ ˈvilkuf] is a village in the administrative district of Gmina Leoncin, within Nowy Dwór County, Masovian Voivodeship, in east-central Poland.
