= Nowiny, Gmina Leoncin =

Nowiny
- Village
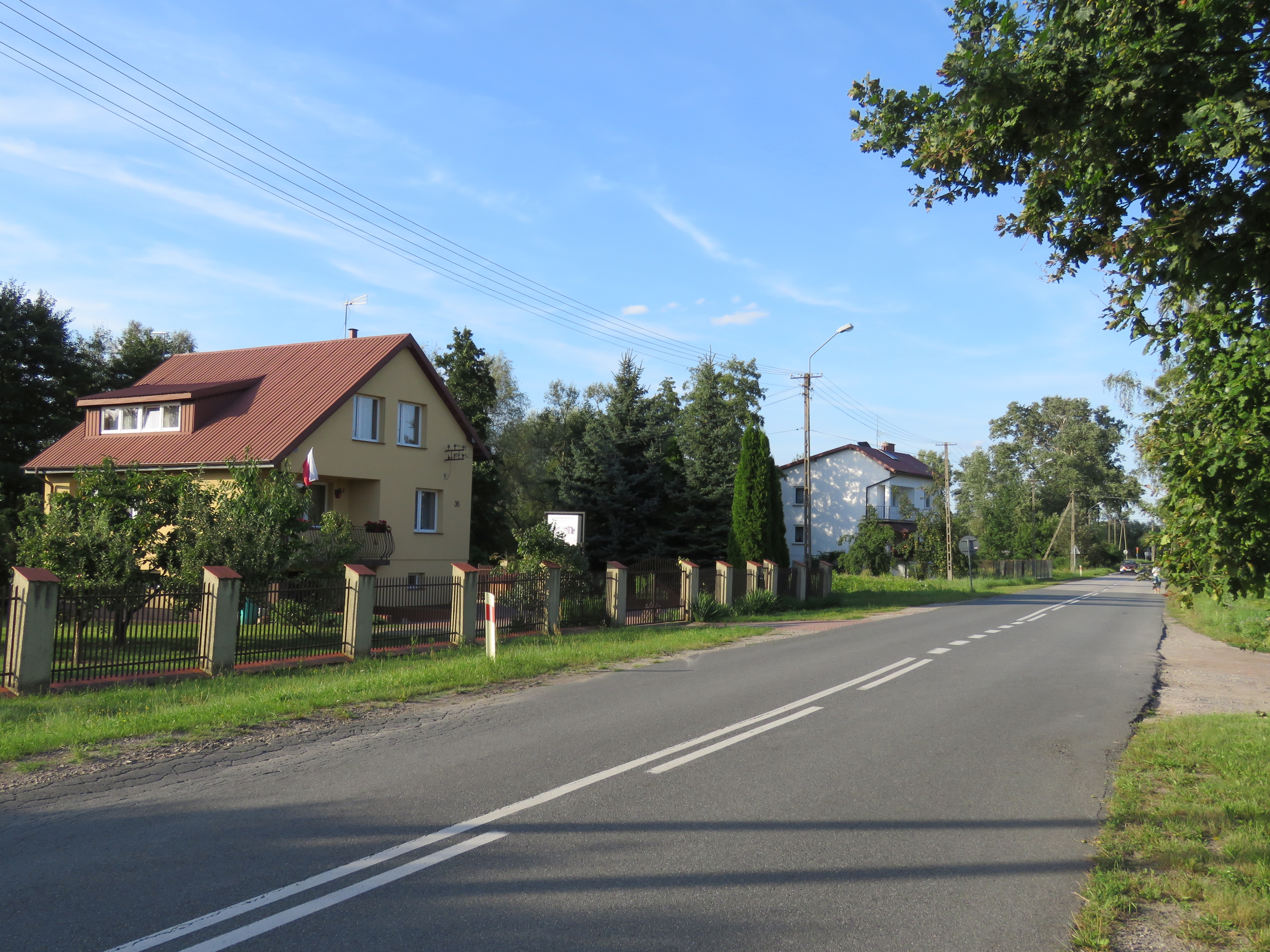
- Roadside house in Nowiny

- Location within Poland
- Coordinates: 52°22′10″N 20°25′36″E
- Country: Poland
- Voivodeship: Masovian
- County: Nowy Dwór
- Gmina: Leoncin

Nowiny [nɔˈvinɨ] is a village in the administrative district of Gmina Leoncin, within Nowy Dwór County, Masovian Voivodeship, in east-central Poland.
