= Cisowe, Masovian Voivodeship =

Cisowe
- Village
- Location within Poland
- Coordinates: 52°20′09″N 20°29′29″E
- Country: Poland
- Voivodeship: Masovian
- County: Nowy Dwór
- Gmina: Leoncin

Cisowe [t͡ɕiˈsɔvɛ] is a village in the administrative district of Gmina Leoncin, within Nowy Dwór County, Masovian Voivodeship, in east-central Poland.
