= Mościejewo =

- Village
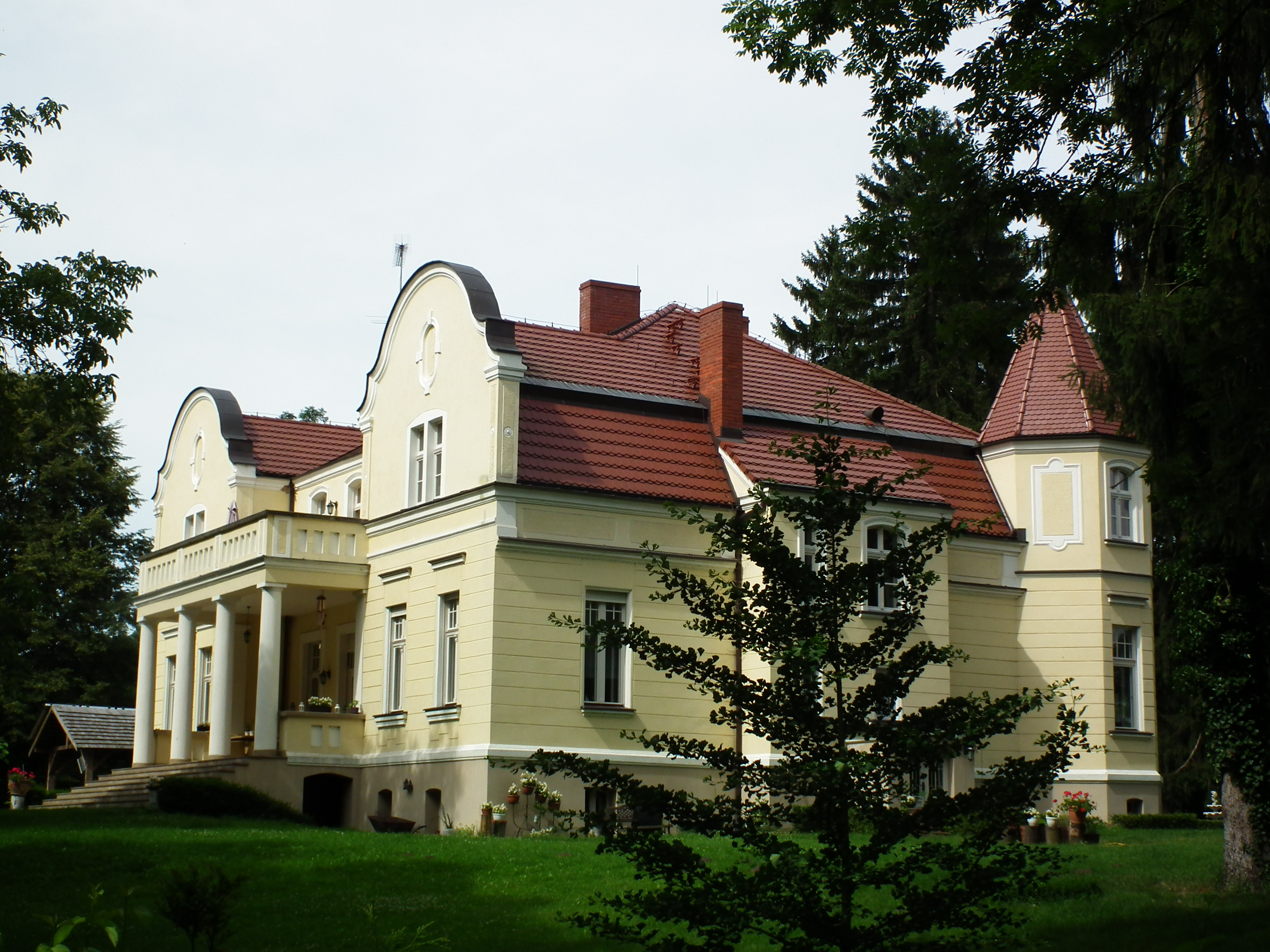
- Manor house, Mosciejewo

- Location within Poland
- Coordinates: 52°35′N 16°10′E
- Country: Poland
- Voivodeship: Greater Poland
- County: Międzychód
- Gmina: Kwilcz

Mościejewo [mɔɕt͡ɕɛˈjɛvɔ] is a village in the administrative district of Gmina Kwilcz, within Międzychód County, Greater Poland Voivodeship, in west-central Poland.
