= Kwilcz =

- Village
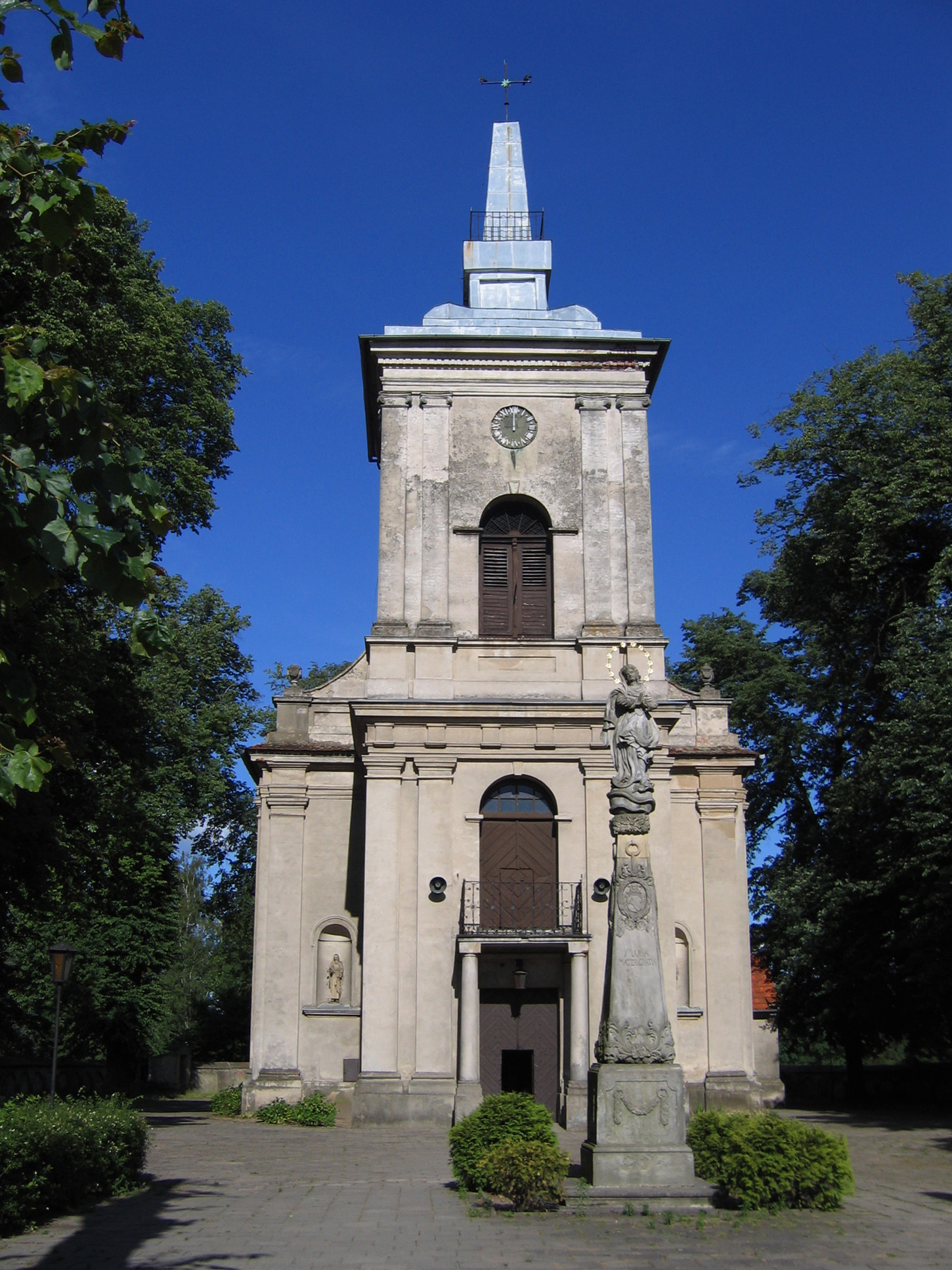
- Saint Michael Church

- Coat of arms

- Location within Poland
- Coordinates: 52°33′13″N 16°5′5″E
- Country: Poland
- Voivodeship: Greater Poland
- County: Międzychód
- Gmina: Kwilcz
- Population: 2,746

Kwilcz [kfilt͡ʂ] is a village in Międzychód County, Greater Poland Voivodeship, in west-central Poland. It is the seat of the gmina (administrative district) called Gmina Kwilcz.

== Distribution of the villages ==
- Kwilcz - a large village (about 2500 inhabitants), The National Road 24, which is the most important center of village councils and village community.
- Orzeszkowo - a village on the national road No. 24, with more than 200 inhabitants;and smaller settlements and hamlets.
- Dąbrówka - otherwise known as Dabrowa, chalet located south of Kwilcz.
- Kozubówka-foresterForester-settlement forest on Provincial Road 186, located on the northern shore of Lake Kwileckiego.
- New oak-with about 42 inhabitants (2003) village situated 3 km south of Kwilcz.
- New Mill-uninhabited forest lodge near the village forester.
- Pólko-hamlet at the national road No. 24, with about 20 people.
- Mill-lodge located in the reserve Beech Ostrow, near the village Mościejewo.

== Sights ==
- Classical parish church. St. Michael the Archangel (1766-1782), a tower with a helmet in the shape of an obelisk. The church altars with paintings from the seventeenth and eighteenth centuries, the pulpit, gravestones Kwilecki from the late eighteenth century. The historical record also includes the fence with sculptures and two baroque chapels.
- The palace complex, which consists of: palace Kwilecki of about 1830, two outbuildings with two mid-eighteenth century landscape park, stables and carriage house away and a wooden gazebo park.
- Farm team, which includes, among others distillery in 1872, granary, Steward's House and carpenter from the late nineteenth century.

== Born in Kwilcz ==
- Walerian Borowczyk - film director; co-founder of the Polish school of the poster and the Polish school of animation.
- Łukasz Ciepliński - Polish soldier who fought in the Polish anti-Nazi and anti-communist resistance movements.
