= Stanisławów, Gmina Leoncin =

Stanisławów
- Village
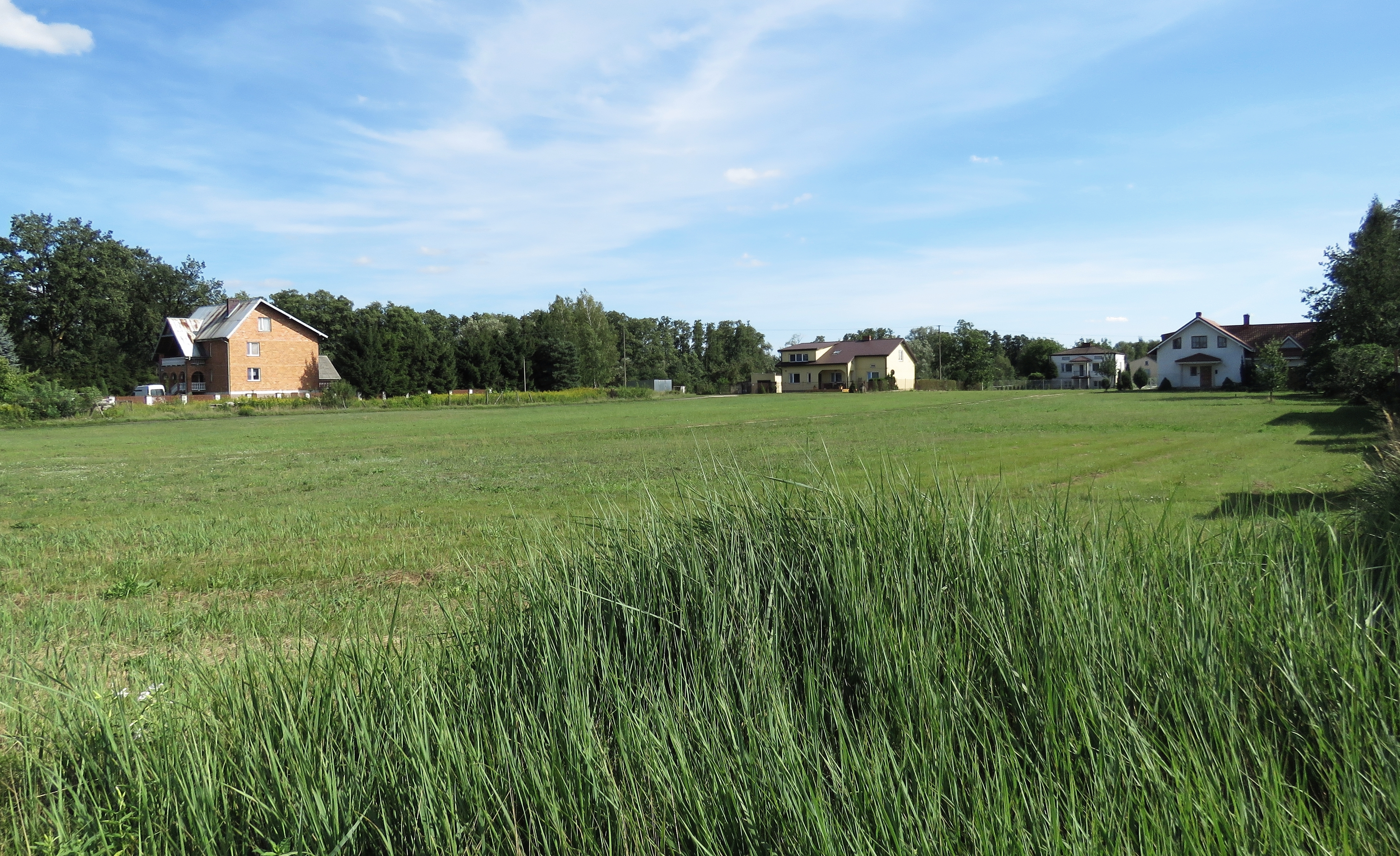

- Location within Poland
- Coordinates: 52°24′N 20°34′E
- Country: Poland
- Voivodeship: Masovian
- County: Nowy Dwór
- Gmina: Leoncin
- Time zone: UTC+1 (CET)
  - Summer (DST): UTC+2 (CEST)
- Vehicle registration: WND

Stanisławów [staniˈswavuf] is a village in the administrative district of Gmina Leoncin, within Nowy Dwór County, Masovian Voivodeship, in east-central Poland.

== History ==
Nine Polish citizens were murdered by Nazi Germany in the village during World War II.
