= Gmina Leoncin =

Gmina Leoncin Leoncin Commune
- Gmina
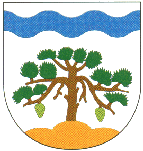
- Coat of arms

- Location within Poland
- Coordinates (Leoncin): 52°24′N 20°33′E
- Country: Poland
- Voivodeship: Masovian
- County: Nowy Dwór
- Seat: Leoncin

Area
  - Total: 158.84 km^{2} (61.33 sq mi)

Population (2011)
  - Total: 5,435
  - Density: 34.22/km^{2} (88.62/sq mi)
- Website: www.regioset.pl/leoncin/

Gmina Leoncin is a rural gmina (administrative district) in Nowy Dwór County, Masovian Voivodeship, in east-central Poland. Its seat is the village of Leoncin, which lies approximately 12 kilometres (7 mi) south-west of Nowy Dwór Mazowiecki and 37 km (23 mi) north-west of Warsaw.

The gmina covers an area of 158.84 square kilometres (61.3 sq mi), and as of 2006 its total population is 5,092 (5,435 in 2011).

== Villages ==
Gmina Leoncin contains the villages and settlements of Cisowe, Gać, Głusk, Gniewniewice Folwarczne, Górki, Krubiczew, Leoncin, Mała Wieś przy Drodze, Michałów, Nowa Dąbrowa, Nowa Mała Wieś, Nowe Budy, Nowe Gniewniewice, Nowe Grochale, Nowe Polesie, Nowiny, Nowy Secymin, Nowy Wilków, Ośniki, Rybitew, Secymin Polski, Secyminek, Stanisławów, Stara Dąbrowa, Stare Gniewniewice, Stare Grochale, Stare Polesie, Teofile, Wilków nad Wisłą, Wilków Polski, Wincentówek and Zamość.

== Neighbouring gminas ==
Gmina Leoncin is bordered by the gminas of Brochów, Czerwińsk nad Wisłą, Czosnów, Kampinos, Leszno and Zakroczym.
