= Michałów, Gmina Leoncin =

Michałów
- Village
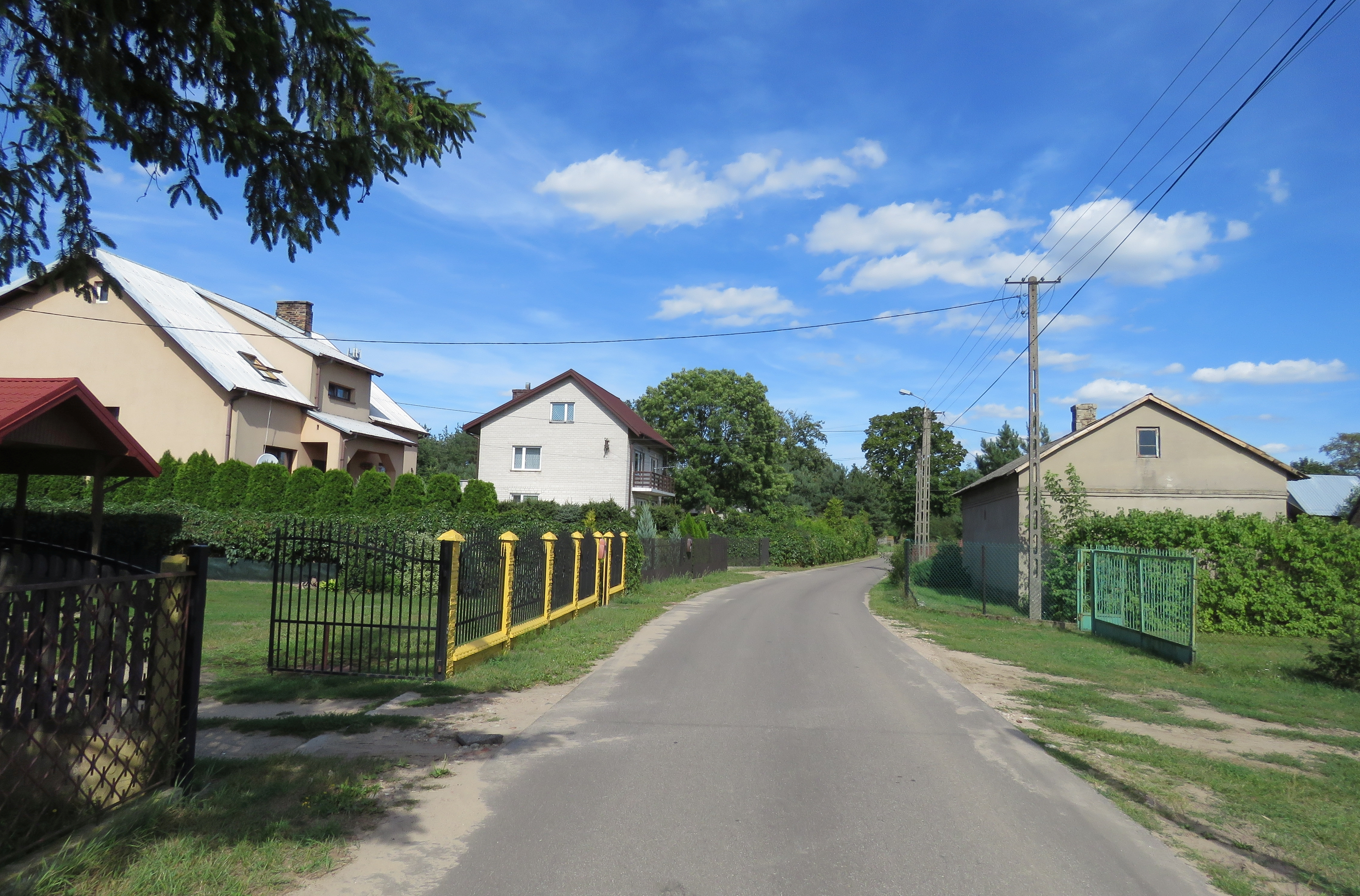
- Roadside house in Michałów

- Location within Poland
- Coordinates: 52°24′08″N 20°31′53″E
- Country: Poland
- Voivodeship: Masovian
- County: Nowy Dwór
- Gmina: Leoncin

Michałów [miˈxawuf] is a village in the administrative district of Gmina Leoncin, within Nowy Dwór County, Masovian Voivodeship, in east-central Poland.
