= Nowe Gniewniewice =

- Village
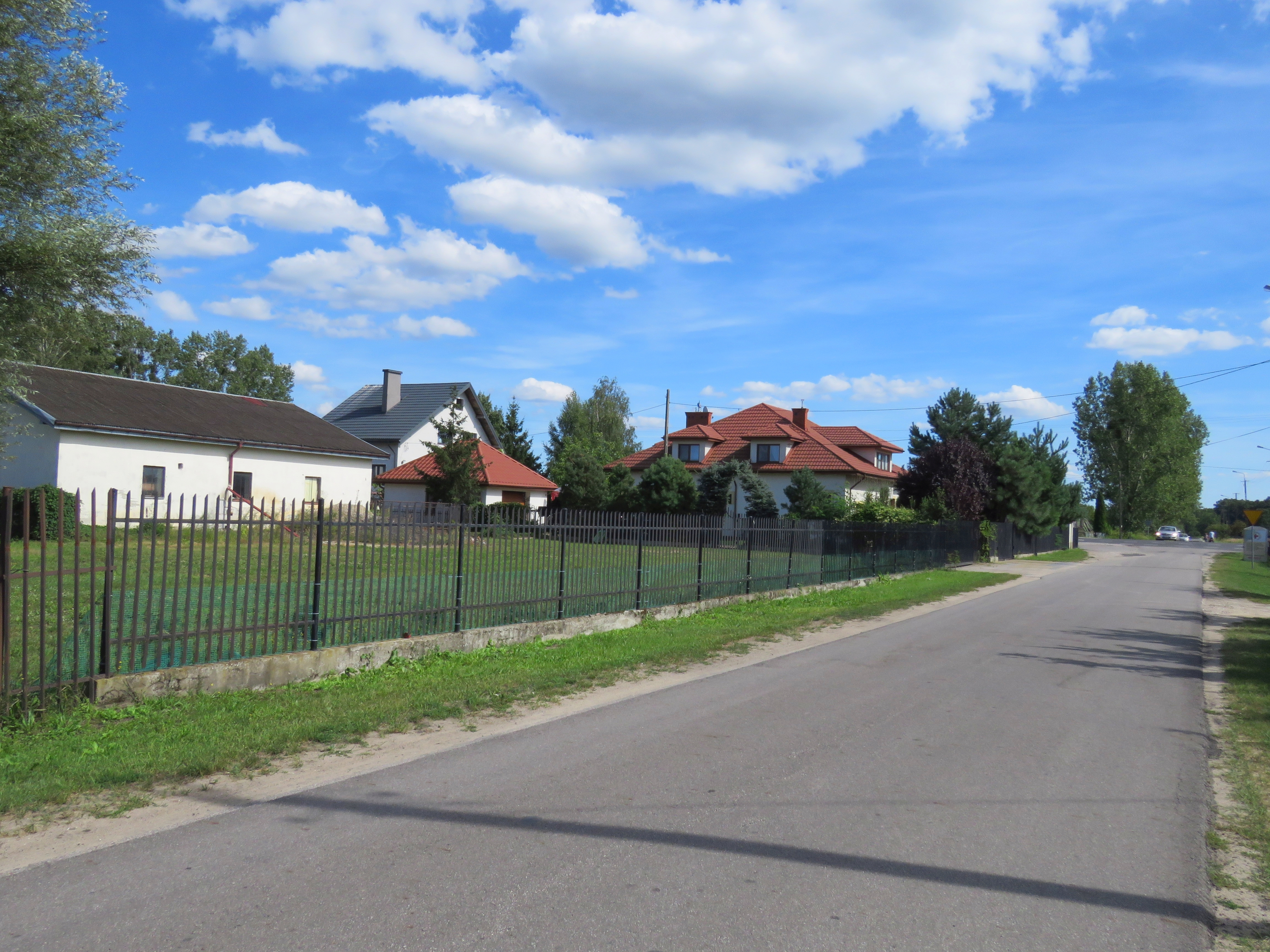
- Wayside houses in the area

- Location within Poland
- Coordinates: 52°24′37″N 20°32′15″E
- Country: Poland
- Voivodeship: Masovian
- County: Nowy Dwór
- Gmina: Leoncin

Nowe Gniewniewice [ˈnɔvɛ ɡɲɛvɲɛˈvit͡sɛ] is a village in the administrative district of Gmina Leoncin, within Nowy Dwór County, Masovian Voivodeship, in east-central Poland.
