= Kozubówka =

Polish village in Greater Poland Voivodeship

- Village
- Location within Poland
- Coordinates: 52°33′31″N 16°07′31″E
- Country: Poland
- Voivodeship: Greater Poland
- County: Międzychód
- Gmina: Kwilcz

Kozubówka [kɔzuˈbufka] is a village in the administrative district of Gmina Kwilcz, within Międzychód County, Greater Poland Voivodeship, in west-central Poland.
