= Nowy Młyn, Międzychód County =

Nowy Młyn
- Village
- Location within Poland
- Coordinates: 52°34′45″N 16°07′20″E
- Country: Poland
- Voivodeship: Greater Poland
- County: Międzychód
- Gmina: Kwilcz

Nowy Młyn [ˈnɔvɨ ˈmwɨn] is a village in the administrative district of Gmina Kwilcz, within Międzychód County, Greater Poland Voivodeship, in west-central Poland.
