= Krubiczew =

- Village
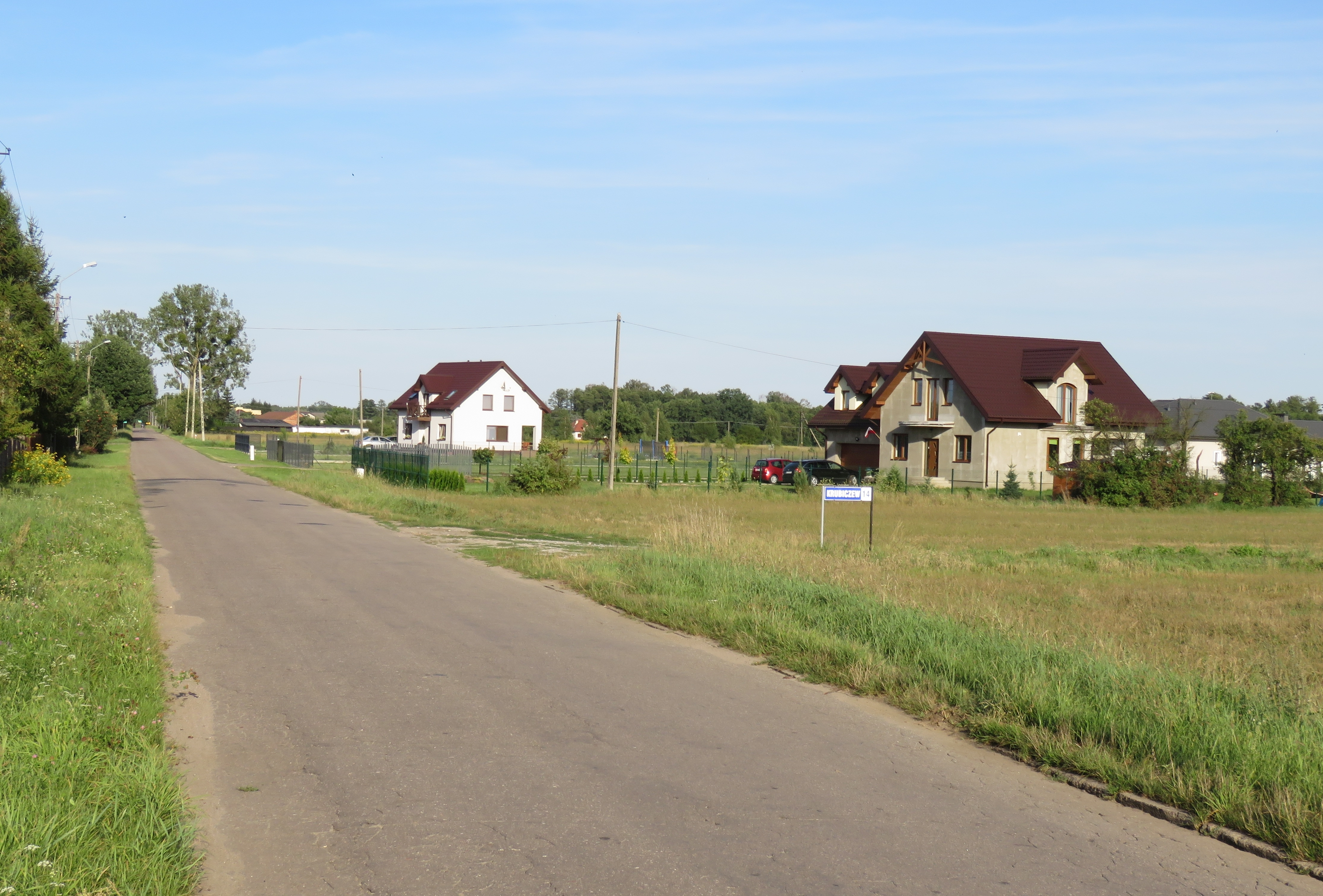
- Roadside houses in Krubiczew

- Location within Poland
- Coordinates: 52°22′01″N 20°26′06″E
- Country: Poland
- Voivodeship: Masovian
- County: Nowy Dwór
- Gmina: Leoncin

Krubiczew [kruˈbit͡ʂɛf] is a village in the administrative district of Gmina Leoncin, within Nowy Dwór County, Masovian Voivodeship, in east-central Poland.
