= Kurnatowice =

- Village
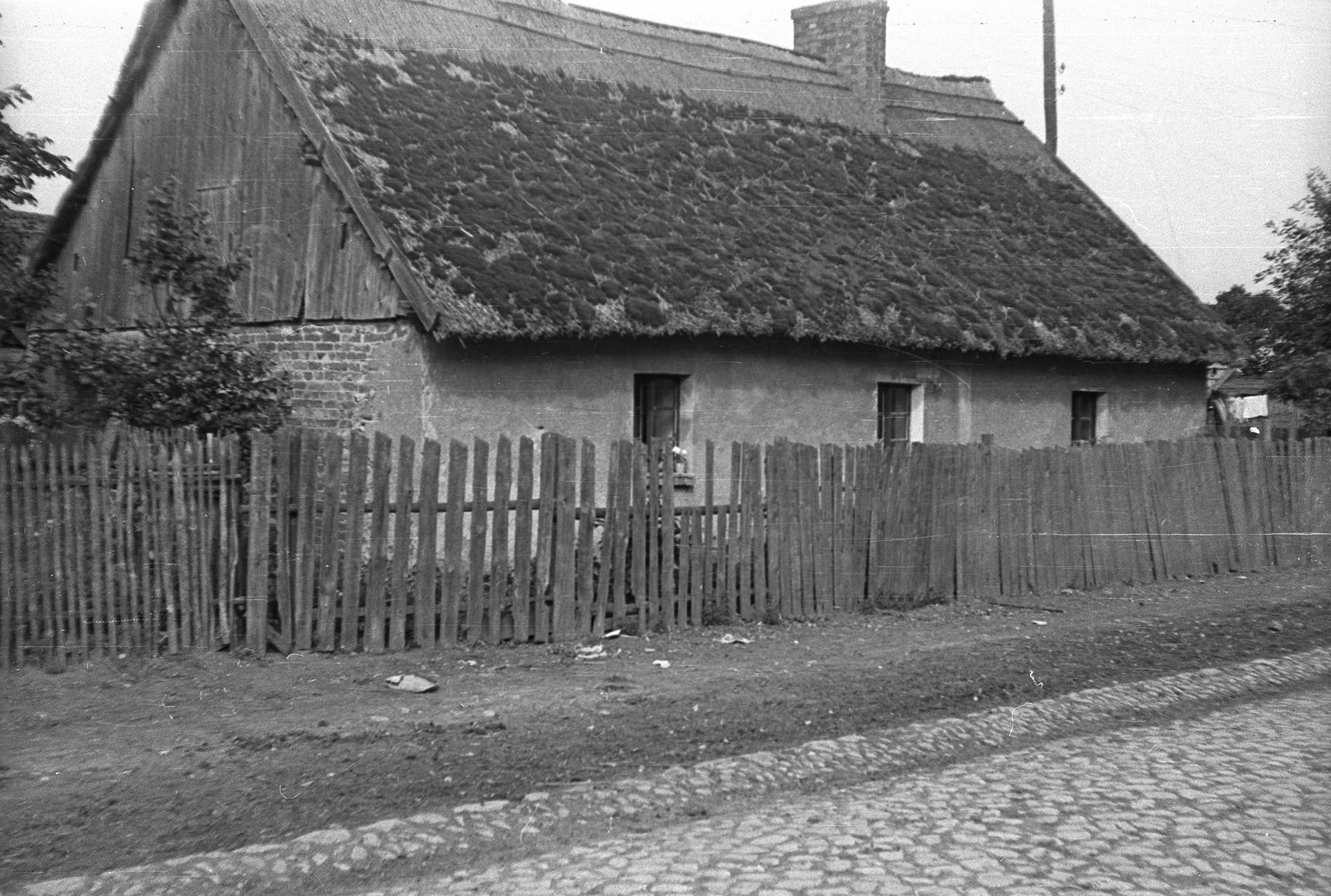
- Kurnatowice, 1957

- Location within Poland
- Coordinates: 52°36′N 16°5′E
- Country: Poland
- Voivodeship: Greater Poland
- County: Międzychód
- Gmina: Kwilcz

Kurnatowice [kurnatɔˈvit͡sɛ] is a village in the administrative district of Gmina Kwilcz, within Międzychód County, Greater Poland Voivodeship, in west-central Poland.
