= Miłostowo, Greater Poland Voivodeship =

Miłostowo
- Village
- Location within Poland
- Coordinates: 52°31′N 16°4′E
- Country: Poland
- Voivodeship: Greater Poland
- County: Międzychód
- Gmina: Kwilcz

Miłostowo [miwɔsˈtɔvɔ] is a village in the administrative district of Gmina Kwilcz, within Międzychód County, Greater Poland Voivodeship, in west-central Poland.
