= Nowa Dąbrowa, Międzychód County =

Nowa Dąbrowa
- Village
- Location within Poland
- Coordinates: 52°31′39″N 16°4′31″E
- Country: Poland
- Voivodeship: Greater Poland
- County: Międzychód
- Gmina: Kwilcz
- Population: 40

Nowa Dąbrowa [ˈnɔva dɔmˈbrɔva] is a village in the administrative district of Gmina Kwilcz, within Międzychód County, Greater Poland Voivodeship, in west-central Poland.
