= Rozbitek =

- Village
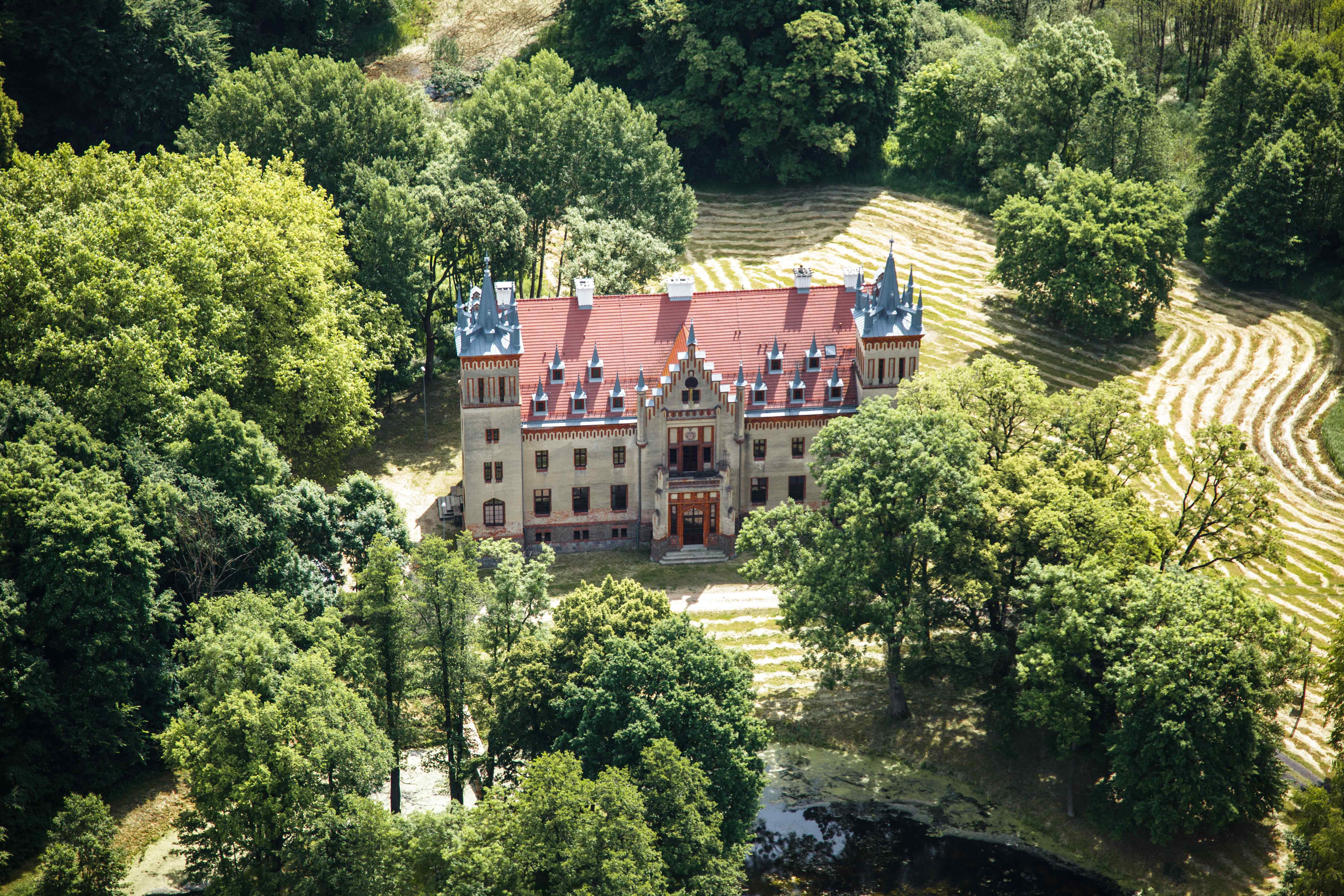
- Rozbitek Castle

- Location within Poland
- Coordinates: 52°34′N 16°4′E
- Country: Poland
- Voivodeship: Greater Poland
- County: Międzychód
- Gmina: Kwilcz

Rozbitek [rɔzˈbitɛk] is a village in the administrative district of Gmina Kwilcz, within Międzychód County, Greater Poland Voivodeship, in west-central Poland.

Rozbitek Castle and Park is currently owned by Oscar - Winning composer Jan A.P. Kaczmarek
