= Nowa Dąbrowa, Masovian Voivodeship =

Nowa Dąbrowa
- Village
- Location within Poland
- Coordinates: 52°19′57″N 20°35′26″E
- Country: Poland
- Voivodeship: Masovian
- County: Nowy Dwór
- Gmina: Leoncin

Nowa Dąbrowa [ˈnɔva dɔmˈbrɔva] is a village in the administrative district of Gmina Leoncin, within Nowy Dwór County, Masovian Voivodeship, in east-central Poland.
