= Stara Dąbrowa, Międzychód County =

Stara Dąbrowa
- Village
- Location within Poland
- Coordinates: 52°31′40″N 16°5′49″E
- Country: Poland
- Voivodeship: Greater Poland
- County: Międzychód
- Gmina: Kwilcz
- Population: 40

Stara Dąbrowa [ˈstara dɔmˈbrɔva] is a village in the administrative district of Gmina Kwilcz, within Międzychód County, Greater Poland Voivodeship, in west-central Poland.
