= Stara Dąbrowa, Masovian Voivodeship =

Stara Dąbrowa
- Village
- Location within Poland
- Coordinates: 52°20′31″N 20°33′51″E
- Country: Poland
- Voivodeship: Masovian
- County: Nowy Dwór
- Gmina: Leoncin
- Population: 260

Stara Dąbrowa [ˈstara dɔmˈbrɔva] is a village in the administrative district of Gmina Leoncin, within Nowy Dwór County, Masovian Voivodeship, in east-central Poland.
