= Orzeszkowo, Międzychód County =

Orzeszkowo
- Village
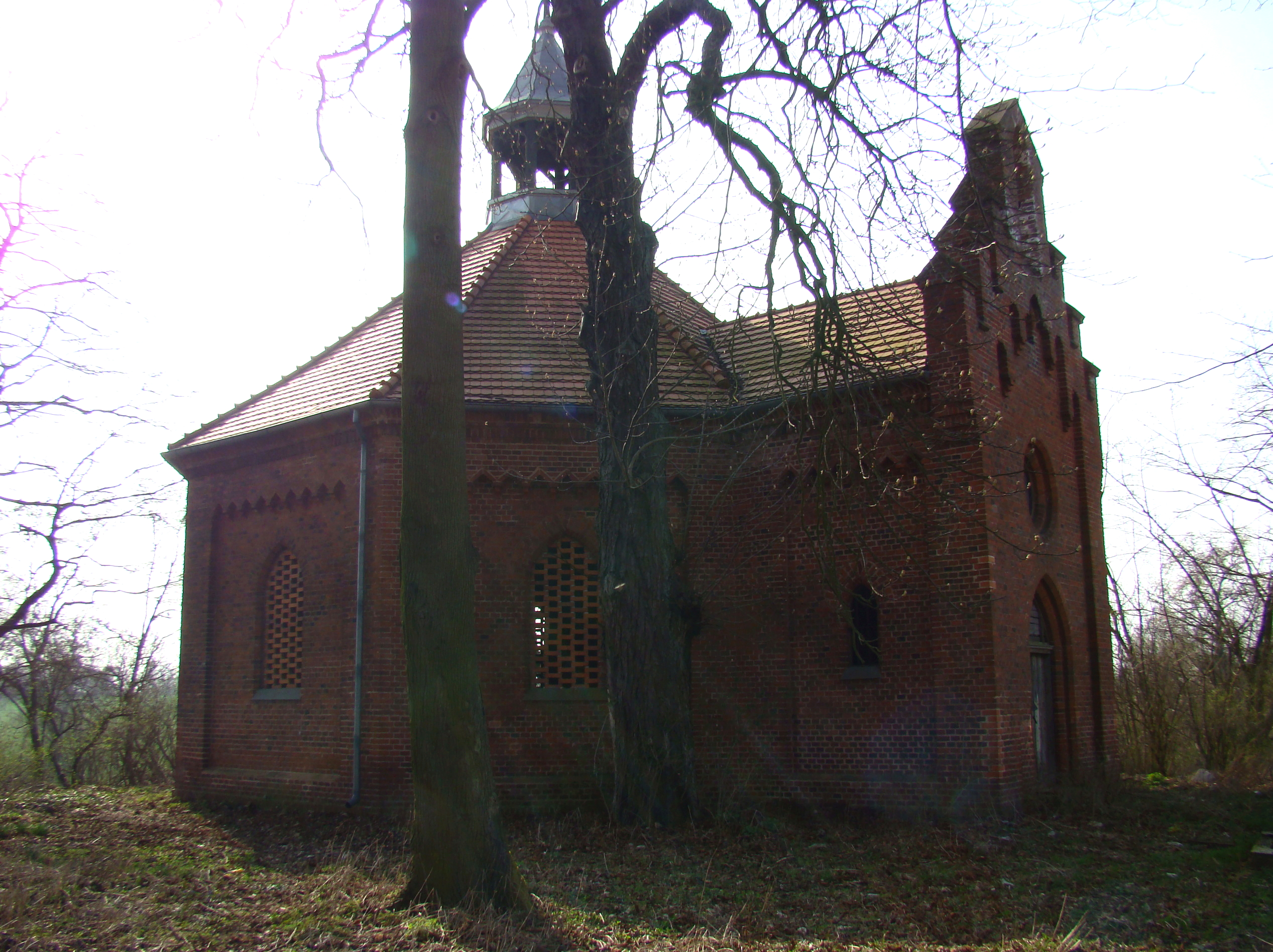
- Abandoned Calvinist church

- Location within Poland
- Coordinates: 52°34′N 16°17′E
- Country: Poland
- Voivodeship: Greater Poland
- County: Międzychód
- Gmina: Kwilcz

Orzeszkowo [ɔʐɛʂˈkɔvɔ] is a village in the administrative district of Gmina Kwilcz, within Międzychód County, Greater Poland Voivodeship, in west-central Poland.
