= Kreis Kulm =

District of Prussia from 1772 to 1920

The district of Kulm was a Prussian district in the Marienwerder administrative region, which existed from 1772 to 1920. The district capital was Kulm. Today the territory of the district lies in the Kuyavian-Pomeranian Voivodeship in Poland.

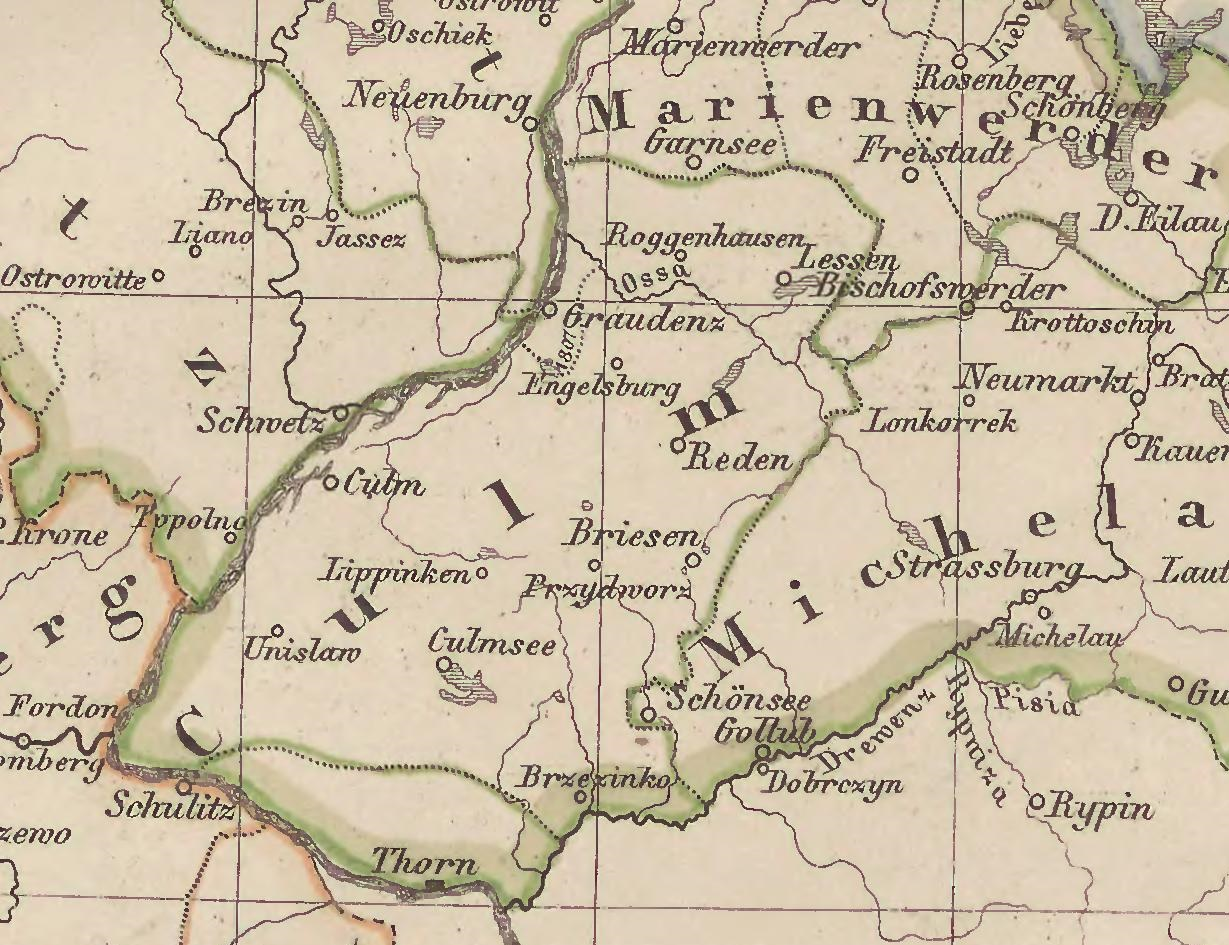
Kreis Kulm (1772 - 1818)

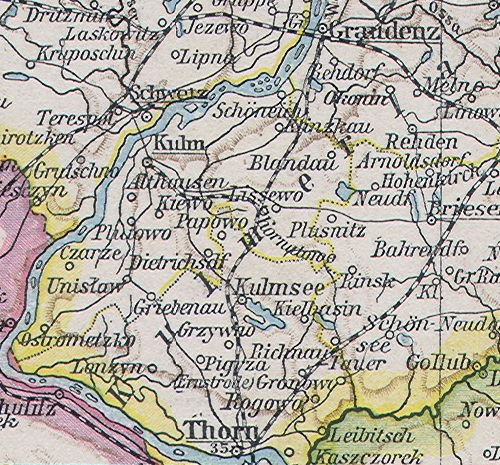
Kreis Kulm (1887 - 1920)

West Prussia (1919) Regierungsbezirk Danzig Regierungsbezirk Marienwerder

== History ==
The area of the Kulm district became part of Prussia after the First Partition of Poland in 1772. The district covered most of the historic region of Chełmno Land. On 30 April 1815 the area became part of the new Marienwerder administrative region of the province of West Prussia. As part of a comprehensive district reform, the old Kulm district was significantly reduced in size on 1 April 1818. The southern parts of the Kulm district formed part of the new district of Thorn and the northern parts formed the new district of Graudenz. The district of Kulm now included the towns of Kulm and Briesen.

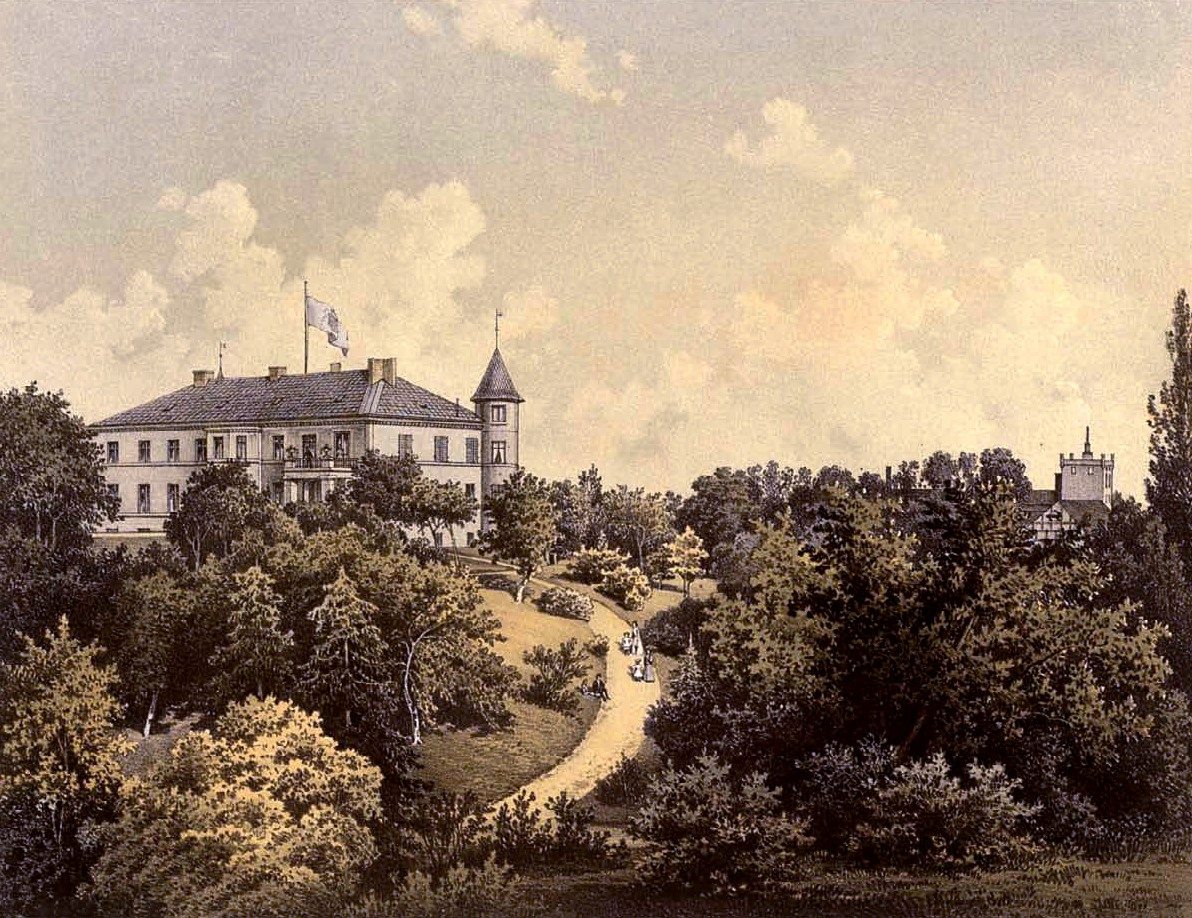
Grubno manor around 1860, Alexander Duncker collection

From 3 December 1829 to 1 April 1878 West Prussia and East Prussia were united to form the Province of Prussia, which had belonged to the German Empire since 1871. Due to the steady increase in population in the 19th century, several districts in West Prussia proved too large. On 1 October 1887, the district of Kulm gave up part of its territory to the new district of Briesen. Due to the provisions of the Treaty of Versailles, the district area had to be ceded to Poland on 10 January 1920.

== Demographics ==
The Kulm district had a mixed population of Germans and Poles. The proportion of the German population declined over the years in the course of the Ostflucht.

Population of the Kulm district
| Year | Total | German | | Polish / Bilingual / Other | |
|---|---|---|---|---|---|
| 1846 | 43,371 | 20,038 | 46.2% | 23,333 | 53.8% |
| 1900 | 48,014 | 21,917 | 45.6% | 26,097 | 54.4% |
| 1905 | 49,521 | 23,521 | 47.5% | 26,000 | 52.5% |
| 1910 | 50,069 | 23,345 | 46.6% | 26,724 | 53.4% |

== Municipalities ==
In 1910, the Kulm district comprised the town of Kulm and 77 rural communities.

Municipalities in Kreis Kulm
| Adlig Neudorf; Adlig Waldau; Althausen; Bienkowko; Blandau; Blotto; Borken; Borowno; Brosowo; Damerau; Dembowitz; Dolken; Dombrowken; Drzonowo; Dübeln; Eiselau; Falkenstein; Firlus; Friedrichsbruch; Gogolin; Grenz; Griebenau; Groß Czyste; Groß Kämpe; Groß Lunau; Hönsdorf | Jamerau; Janowo; Kaldus; Kielp; Klammer; Klein Kämpe; Klein Lunau; Kokotzko; Kollenken; Kölln; Königlich Groß Trzebcz; Königlich Kiewo; Königlich Waldau; Kornatowo; Kottenau; Krajenczyn; Kulm, town; Kulmisch Dorposch; Kulmisch Neudorf; Kulmisch Roßgarten; Lissewo; Malankowo; Mosgowin; Neu Bolumin; Neugut; Neusaß | Niederausmaß; Oberausmaß; Osnowo; Plangenau; Pniewitten; Podwitz; Raffa; Reinau; Rosenau; Ruda; Scharnese; Schemlau; Schlonz; Schöneich; Schönsee; Segertsdorf; Steinwage; Striesau; Strutzfon; Trebis; Unislaw; Villisaß; Waltersdorf; Wilhelmsau; Wilhelmsbruch; Zakrzewo |

== Notable people ==
Heinz Guderian, Kurt Schumacher and Hermann Löns were born in Kulm.
