= Niemczyk =

Niemczyk is a Polish surname, a diminutive of "niemiec", "German person". It can be transliterated as Nemchik. Notable people with the surname include:

- Aldona Niemczyk (born 1969), German politician
- Andrzej Niemczyk (1944–2016), Polish volleyball coach
- Barbara Niemczyk (born 1942), Polish volleyball player
- Carolin Niemczyk (born 1990), German singer
- Jakub Niemczyk (born 2004), Polish footballer
- Julian Niemczyk (1920–2009), American diplomat
- Leon Niemczyk (1923–2006), Polish actor
- George Nemchik (1915–1988), American soccer player

== See also ==
- Niemczyk, Kuyavian-Pomeranian Voivodeship, a village in north-central Poland
