= Papowo Biskupie =

- Village
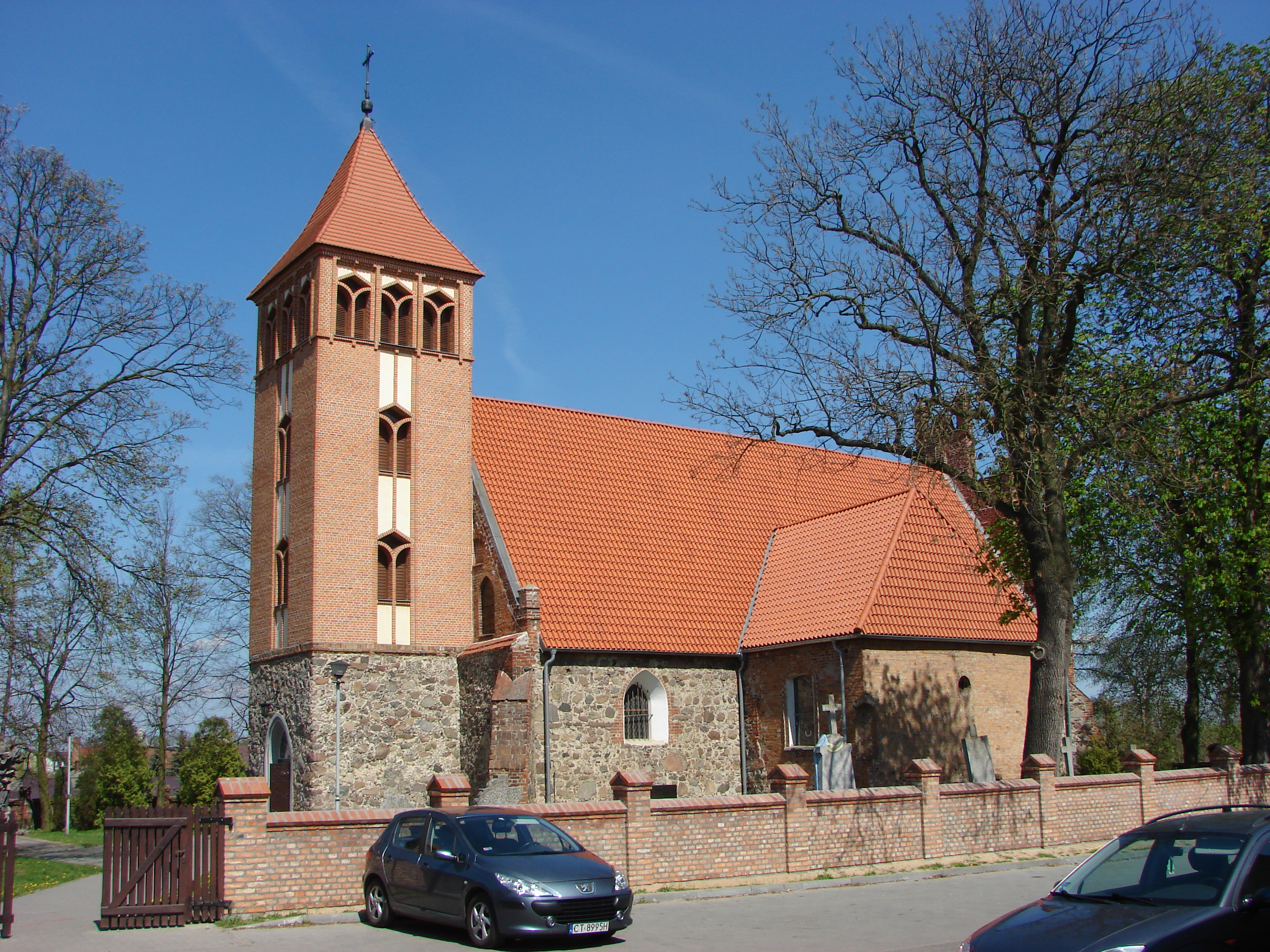
- Gothic Saint Nicholas church in Papowo Biskupie

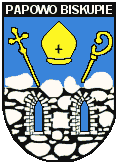
- Coat of arms

- Location within Poland
- Coordinates: 53°15′N 18°34′E
- Country: Poland
- Voivodeship: Kuyavian-Pomeranian
- County: Chełmno
- Gmina: Papowo Biskupie
- First mentioned: 1222
- Population: 720
- Vehicle registration: CCH

Papowo Biskupie [paˈpɔvɔ bisˈkupjɛ] is a village in Chełmno County, Kuyavian-Pomeranian Voivodeship, in north-central Poland. It is the seat of the gmina (administrative district) called Gmina Papowo Biskupie. It is located in the Chełmno Land in the historic region of Pomerania.

Historic sights in the village include the Gothic St. Nicholas church and ruins of a Teutonic Order castle.

Papowo Biskupie is the birthplace of Polish singer, musical performer and actress Irena Santor (born 1934).

== History ==
The village dates back to the Middle Ages, and was first mentioned in 1222. It was a royal village of the Polish Crown until 1505, when Polish King Alexander Jagiellon granted it to the Roman Catholic Diocese of Chełmno. Administratively it was located in the Polish Chełmno Voivodeship. It was annexed by Prussia in the First Partition of Poland in 1772, and from 1871 it was part of Germany, before it was reintegrated with Poland after the country regained independence following World War I in 1918.

During the German occupation of Poland (World War II), a forced labour subcamp of the Stalag XX-A prisoner-of-war camp was operated by the Germans in the village.

== Sports ==
The local football club is Kasztelan Papowo Biskupie. It competes in the lower leagues.

== Gallery ==
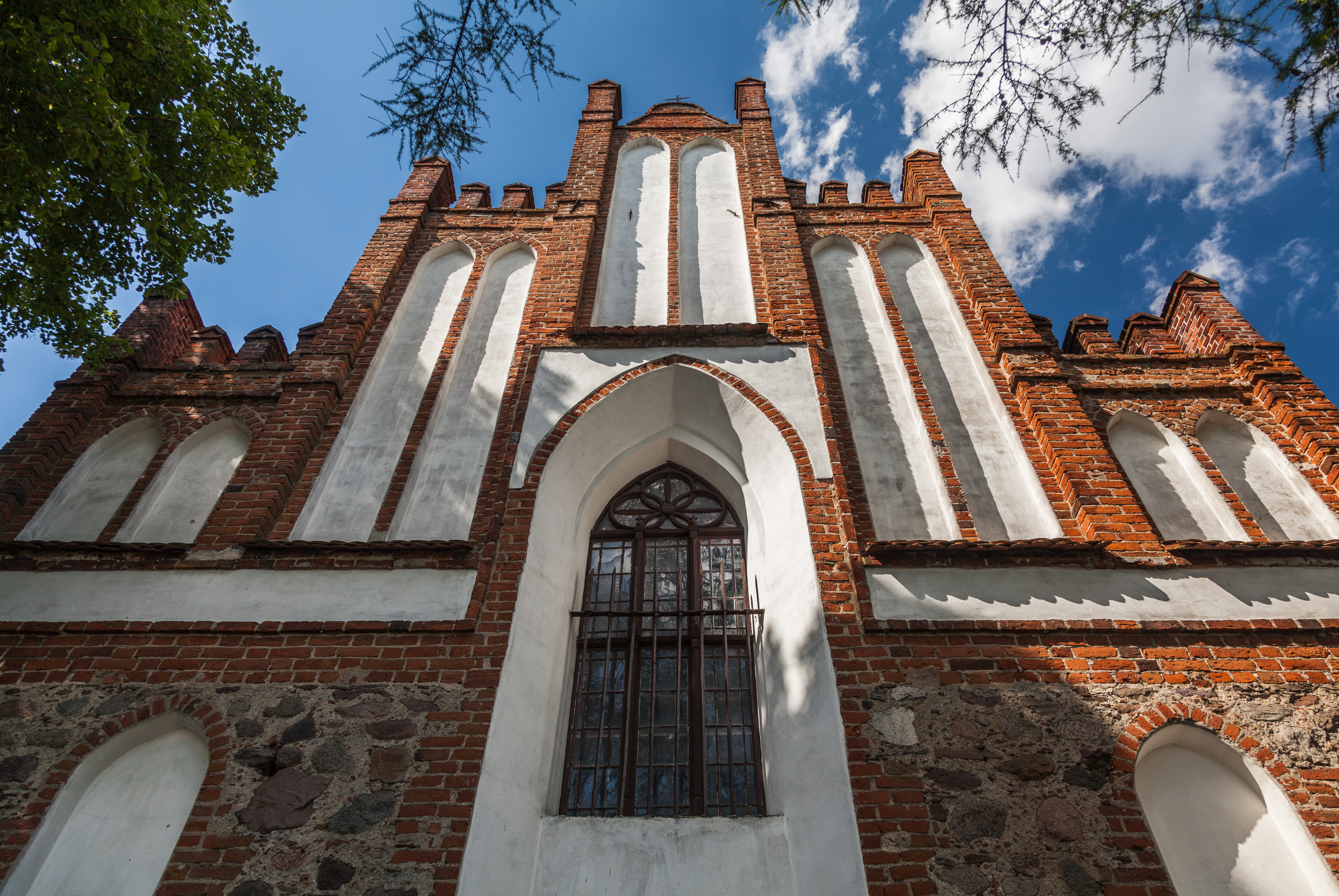
Gothic Saint Nicholas church

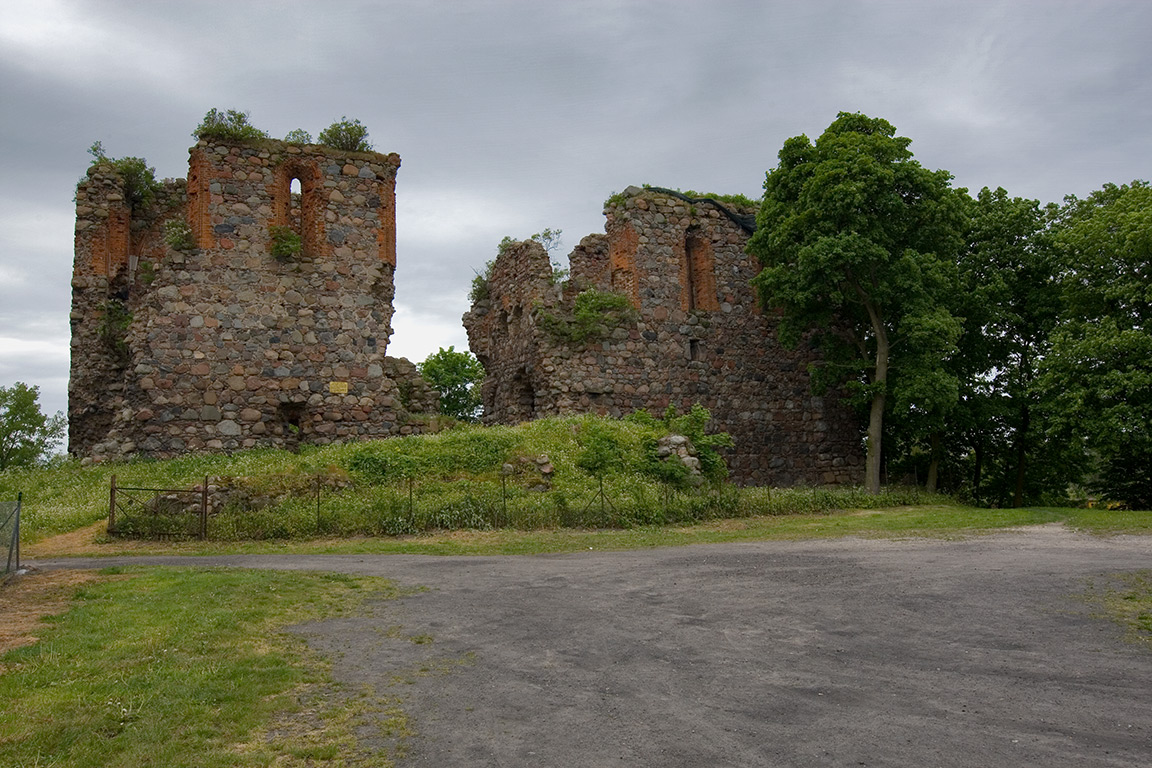
Ruins of the castle

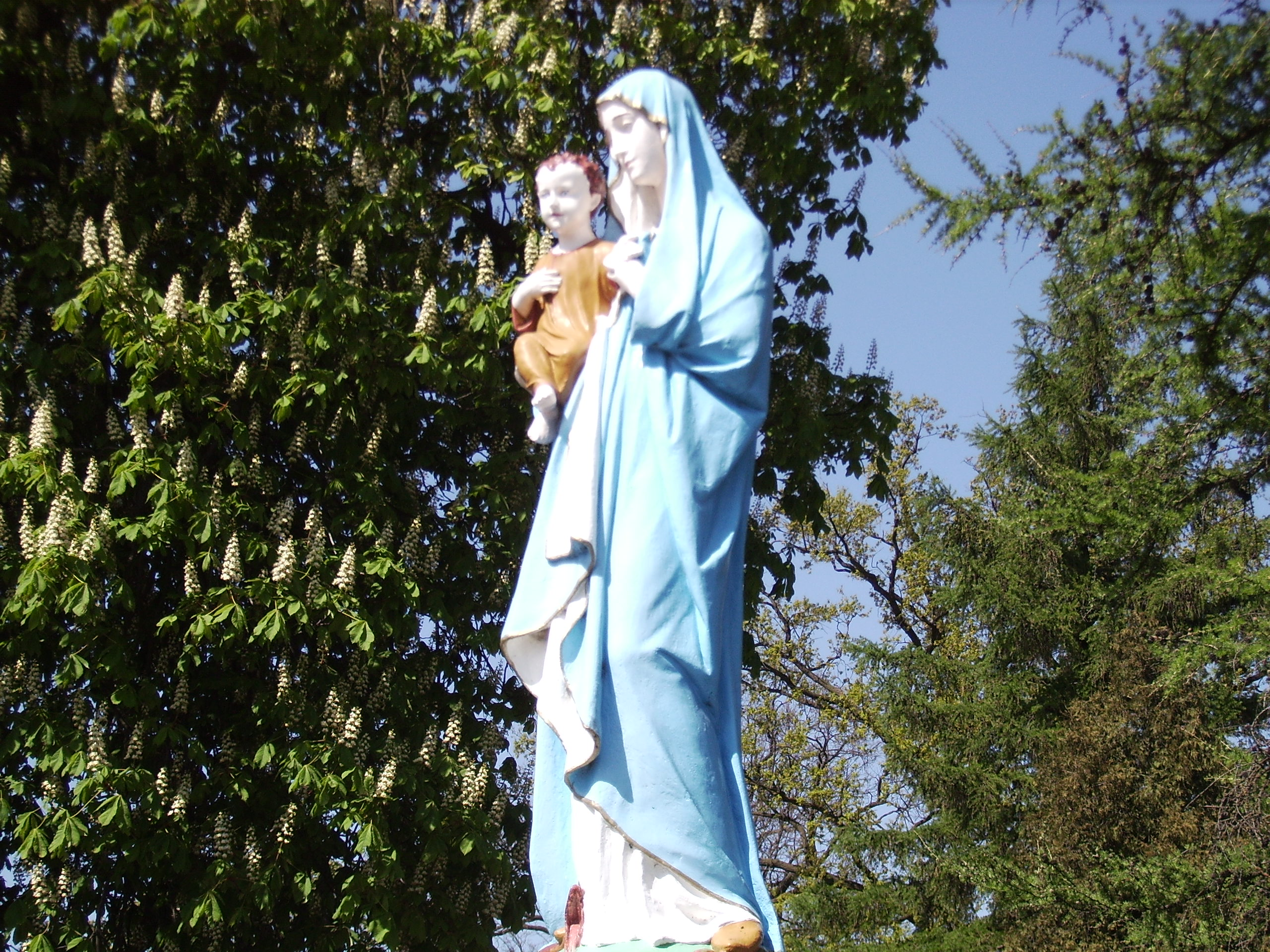
Saint Mary Figure by the cemetery

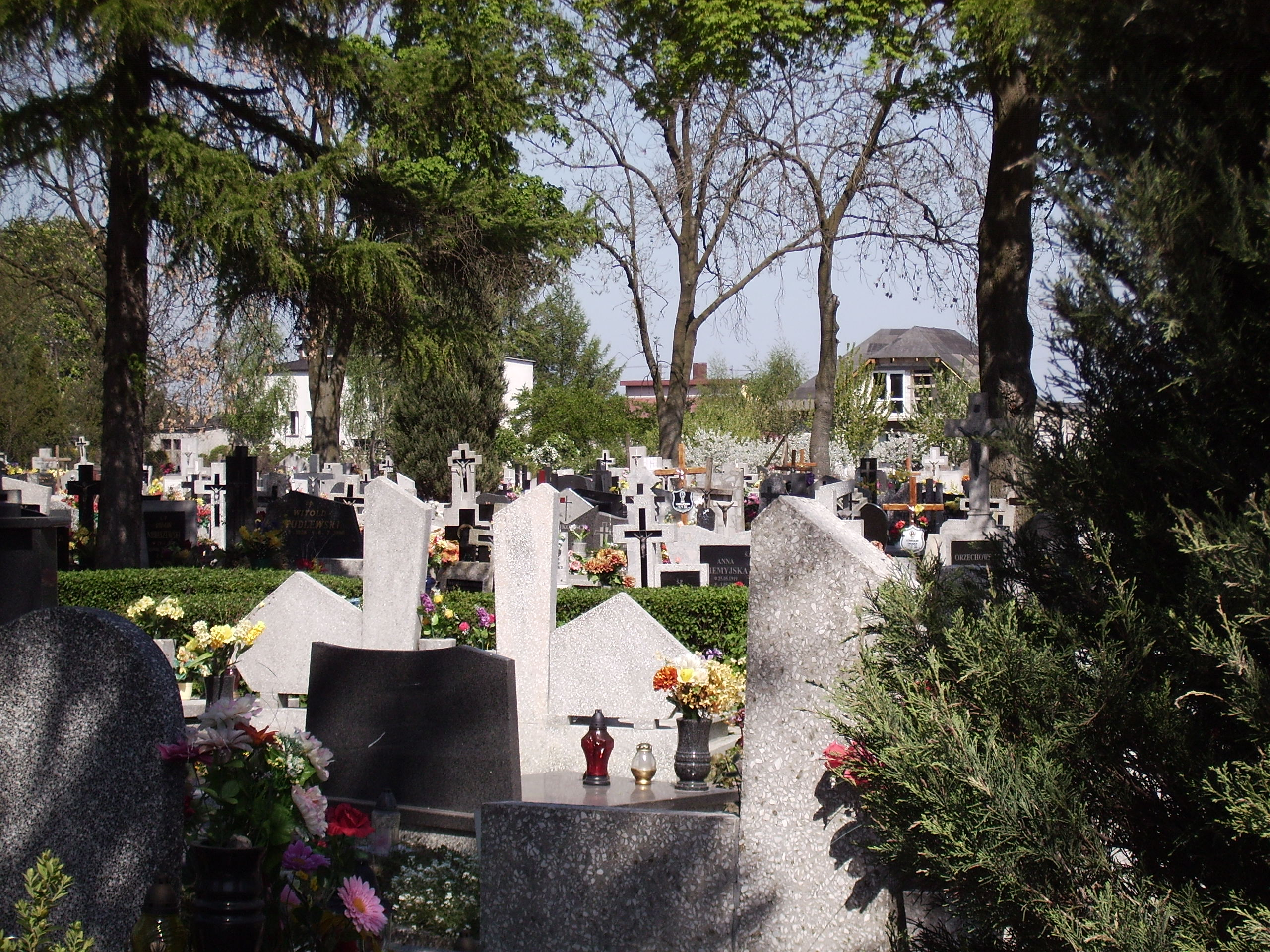
Cemetery

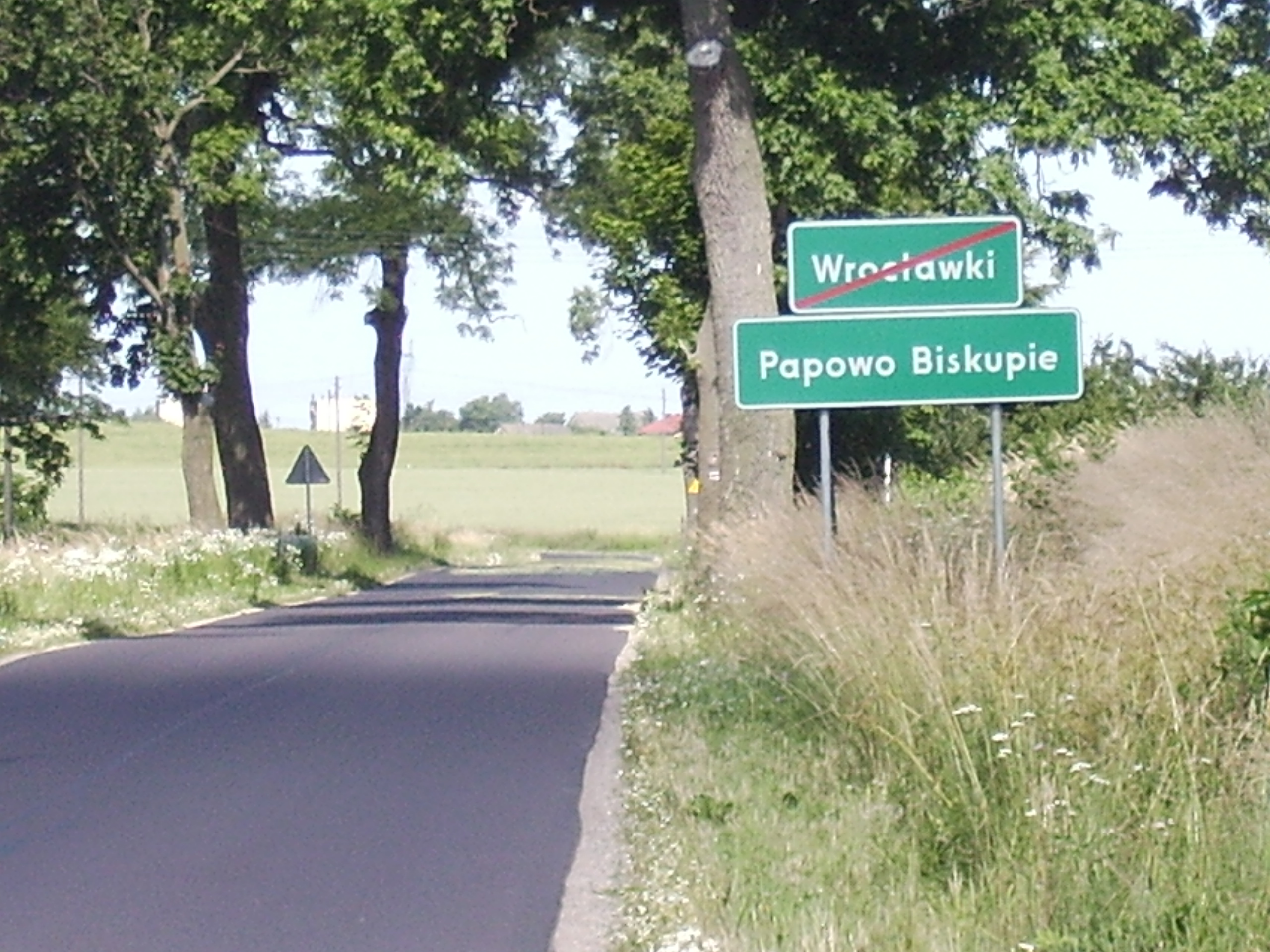
Road sign at the entrance to Papowo Biskupie from the neighbouring village of Wrocławki

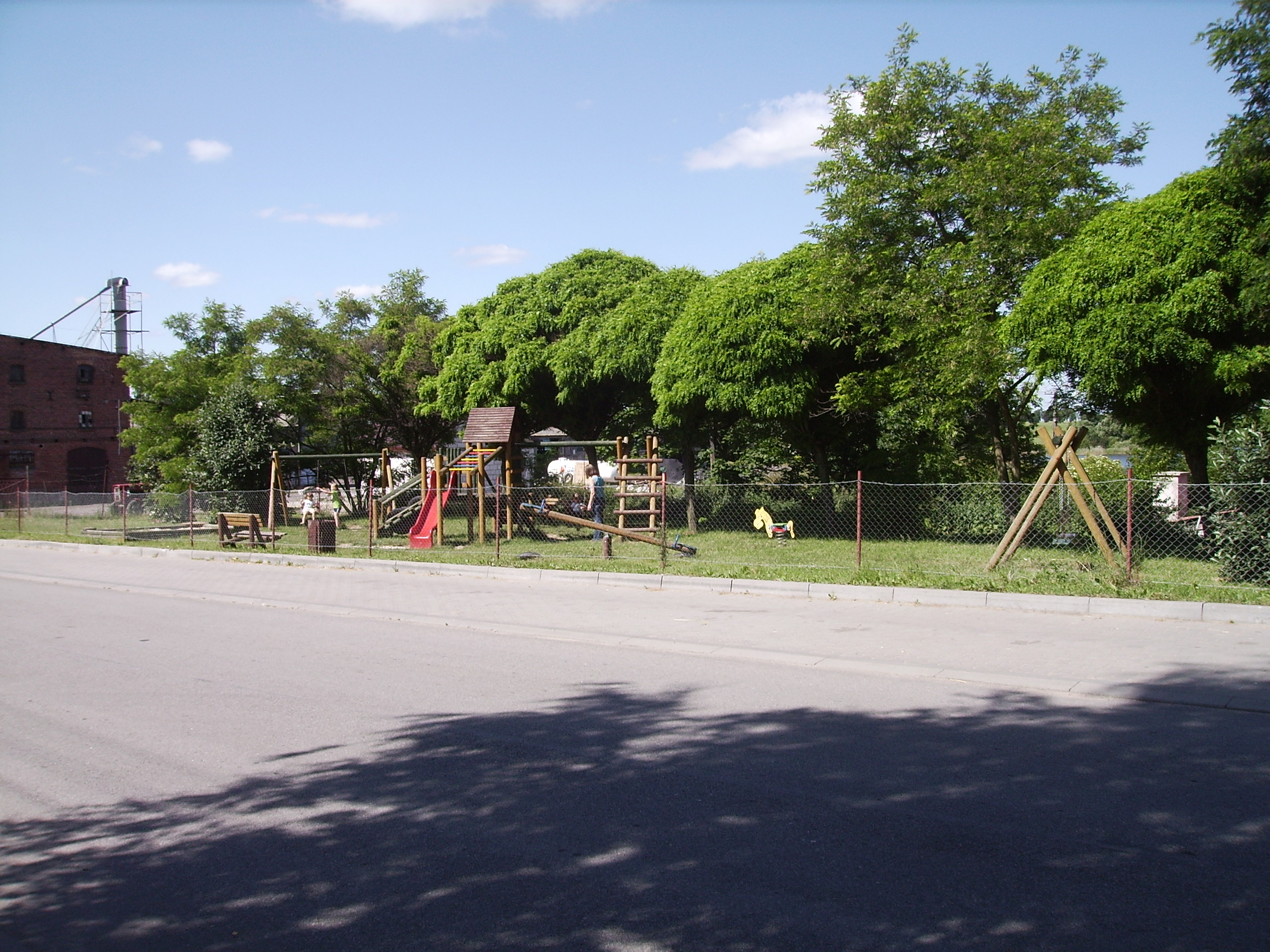
A playground.
