= Chrapice =

Former village in Poland

Chrapice is a village which no longer exists that was located on area of Dubielno and Skąpe villages (Gmina Papowo Biskupie). The first recorded information about the village comes from 1264: in chronicles and documents the village was called: Hermannistor (1264), Crapitz, Chrapiec (1400), Crapitcz (1438), Crapycz (1511), Chrapice (1642), and Chrapitz (1885). In Middle Ages the village was adhering to klucz papowski. In 1505 the village was hand over to bishops of Culm. 38 people lived in Chrapice according to its first census from 1773. In the 19th century many settlers of German ancestry came to the village, which changed the religious structure. In 1885 95 Evangelicals and only 14 Catholics lived there. In 1925 the village belonged to Toruń County and in the 1970s no one was living in Chrapice and area of it were given to Dubielno and Skąpe villages.
