= Storlus =

- Village
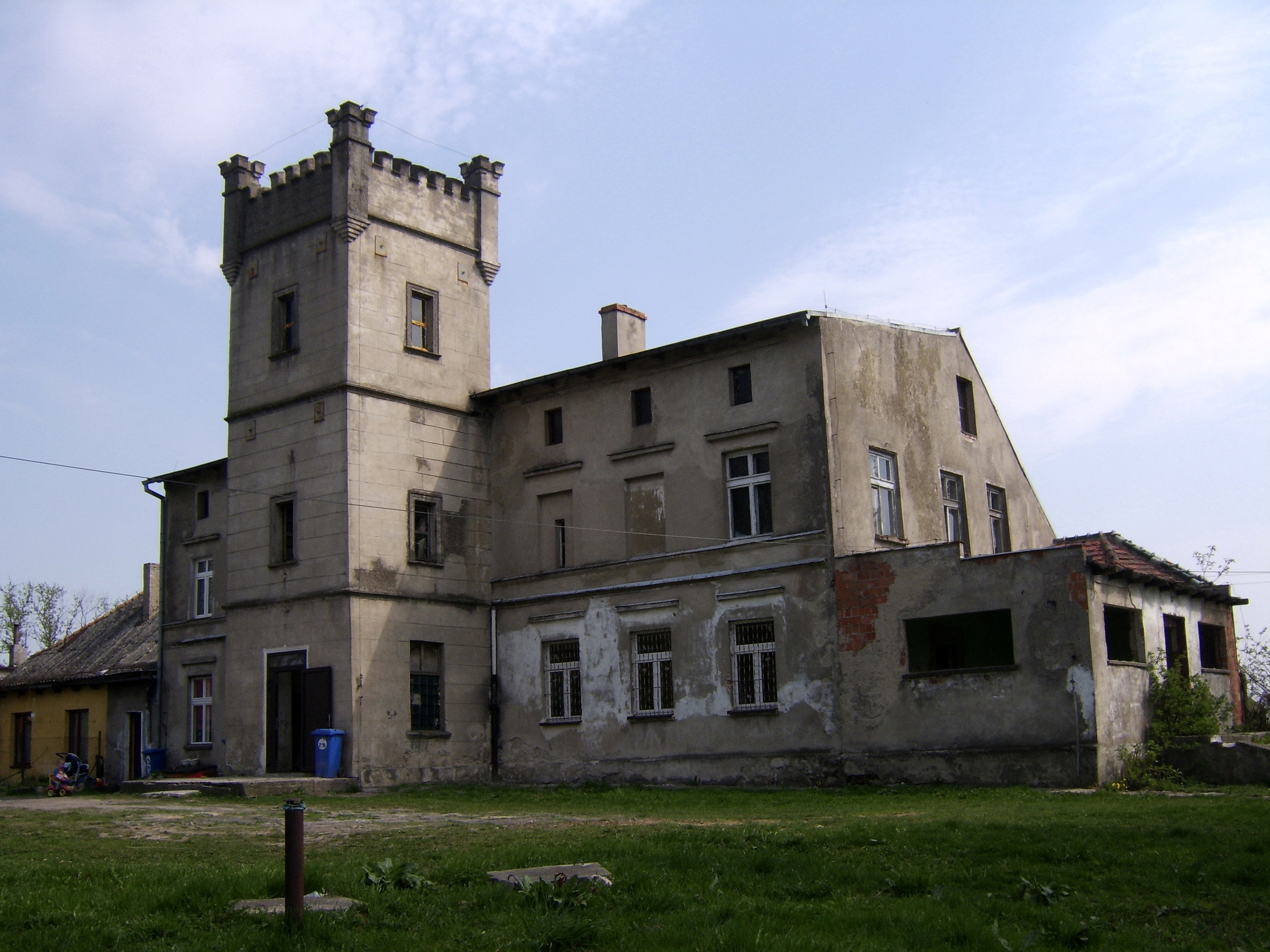
- Manor house in the village of Storlus

- Location within Poland
- Coordinates: 53°16′44″N 18°31′22″E
- Country: Poland
- Voivodeship: Kuyavian-Pomeranian
- County: Chełmno
- Gmina: Papowo Biskupie
- Population: 292

Storlus [ˈstɔrlus] is a village in the administrative district of Gmina Papowo Biskupie, within Chełmno County, Kuyavian-Pomeranian Voivodeship, in north-central Poland.
