= Kucborek =

- Village
- Location within Poland
- Coordinates: 53°13′40″N 18°34′22″E
- Country: Poland
- Voivodeship: Kuyavian-Pomeranian
- County: Chełmno
- Gmina: Papowo Biskupie

Kucborek [kut͡sˈbɔrɛk] is a village in the administrative district of Gmina Papowo Biskupie, within Chełmno County, Kuyavian-Pomeranian Voivodeship, in north-central Poland.
