= Nowy Dwór Królewski =

- Village
- Location within Poland
- Coordinates: 53°16′07″N 18°35′20″E
- Country: Poland
- Voivodeship: Kuyavian-Pomeranian
- County: Chełmno
- Gmina: Papowo Biskupie
- Population: 190

Nowy Dwór Królewski (Polish pronunciation: [ˈnɔvɨ ˈdvur kruˈlɛfskʲi]) is a village in the administrative district of Gmina Papowo Biskupie, within Chełmno County, Kuyavian-Pomeranian Voivodeship, in north-central Poland. The built areas of the village take up 3.37 square km.

The village has an area of 337 ha. On her land are 32 individual households, of which the largest is Roman Szulz's. In the village is found a palace built circa 1875. In the year 1900 the village became the property of Zuzanna Witte. From 1910 to 1945 the village was owned by Gerhard Witte.

== History ==
=== Middle Ages to 1800 ===
The town was first mentioned in 1398. In that year, it is written that Nowy Dwór Królewski bred 32 horses, 20 cattle, 215 sheep, and 90 pigs. It appeared in German in documents and chronicles as Nuwenhof, Nuwenhuf, Nuwemhoff, and Koenigliche Neuhof. From 1398 to 1421 it was a village of the Teutonic Order. In 1505 the village was owned by the Bishop of Chełmno.

In 1772, during the Polish Partition, the village became the property of West Prussia, in the department Kwidzyn. The first known census of residents was taken in 1773.

=== Recent times ===
Shortly before the outbreak of World War II, most inhabitants left their homes in fear of the Germans. Soon after the start of the war, the village was taken over. At that time parts of the village were destroyed.

From 1975 to 1998 the village belonged to the administrative region of Toruń. In 1996, it was connected to the telephone network (in area code 56).

== Nearby villages ==
Nearby villages
| Village | km |
|---|---|
| Niemczyk | 1 |
| Folgowo | 2 |
| Staw | 2 |
| Wrocławki | 2 |
| Bartlewo | 3 |
| Firlus | 3 |
| Papowo Biskupie | 3 |
| Błachta | 4 |
| Tytlewo | 4 |
| Lipienek | 4 |
| Łyniec | 9 |
| Piątkowo | 9 |
| Napole | 9 |
| Zakrzewo | 9 |
| Zelgno-Bezdół | 9 |
| Wabcz | 9 |
| Malankowo | 9 |
| Rybieniec | 9 |
| Witkowo | 9 |
| Wabcz Kolonia | 9 |
