= Folgowo =

- Village
- Location within Poland
- Coordinates: 53°17′N 18°34′E
- Country: Poland
- Voivodeship: Kuyavian-Pomeranian
- County: Chełmno
- Gmina: Papowo Biskupie

Folgowo [fɔlˈɡɔvɔ] is a village in the administrative district of Gmina Papowo Biskupie, within Chełmno County, Kuyavian-Pomeranian Voivodeship, in north-central Poland.
