= Jeleniec, Kuyavian-Pomeranian Voivodeship =

Jeleniec
- Village
- Location within Poland
- Coordinates: 53°16′22″N 18°29′45″E
- Country: Poland
- Voivodeship: Kuyavian-Pomeranian
- County: Chełmno
- Gmina: Papowo Biskupie
- Population: 560

Jeleniec [jɛˈlɛɲɛt͡s] is a village in the administrative district of Gmina Papowo Biskupie, within Chełmno County, Kuyavian-Pomeranian Voivodeship, in north-central Poland.
