= Żygląd =

- Village
- Location within Poland
- Coordinates: 53°15′N 18°31′E
- Country: Poland
- Voivodeship: Kuyavian-Pomeranian
- County: Chełmno
- Gmina: Papowo Biskupie

Żygląd [ˈʐɨɡlɔnt] is a village in the administrative district of Gmina Papowo Biskupie, within Chełmno County, Kuyavian-Pomeranian Voivodeship, in north-central Poland.
