= Zegartowice, Kuyavian-Pomeranian Voivodeship =

Zegartowice
- Village
- Location within Poland
- Coordinates: 53°14′N 18°32′E
- Country: Poland
- Voivodeship: Kuyavian-Pomeranian
- County: Chełmno
- Gmina: Papowo Biskupie
- Population: 489

Zegartowice [zɛɡartɔˈvit͡sɛ] is a village in the administrative district of Gmina Papowo Biskupie, within Chełmno County, Kuyavian-Pomeranian Voivodeship, in north-central Poland.

There is a primary school in Zegartowice.

== Gallery ==
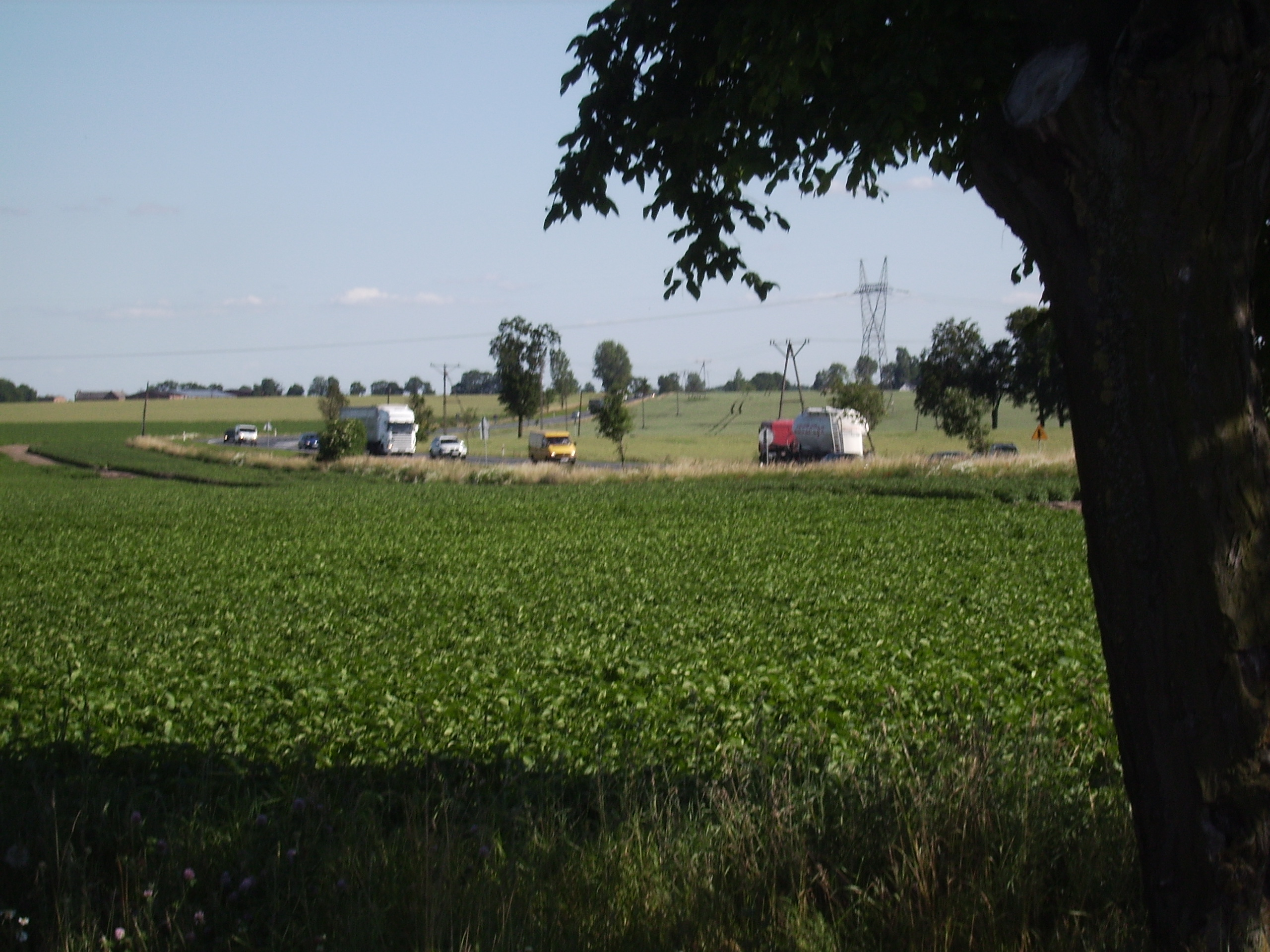

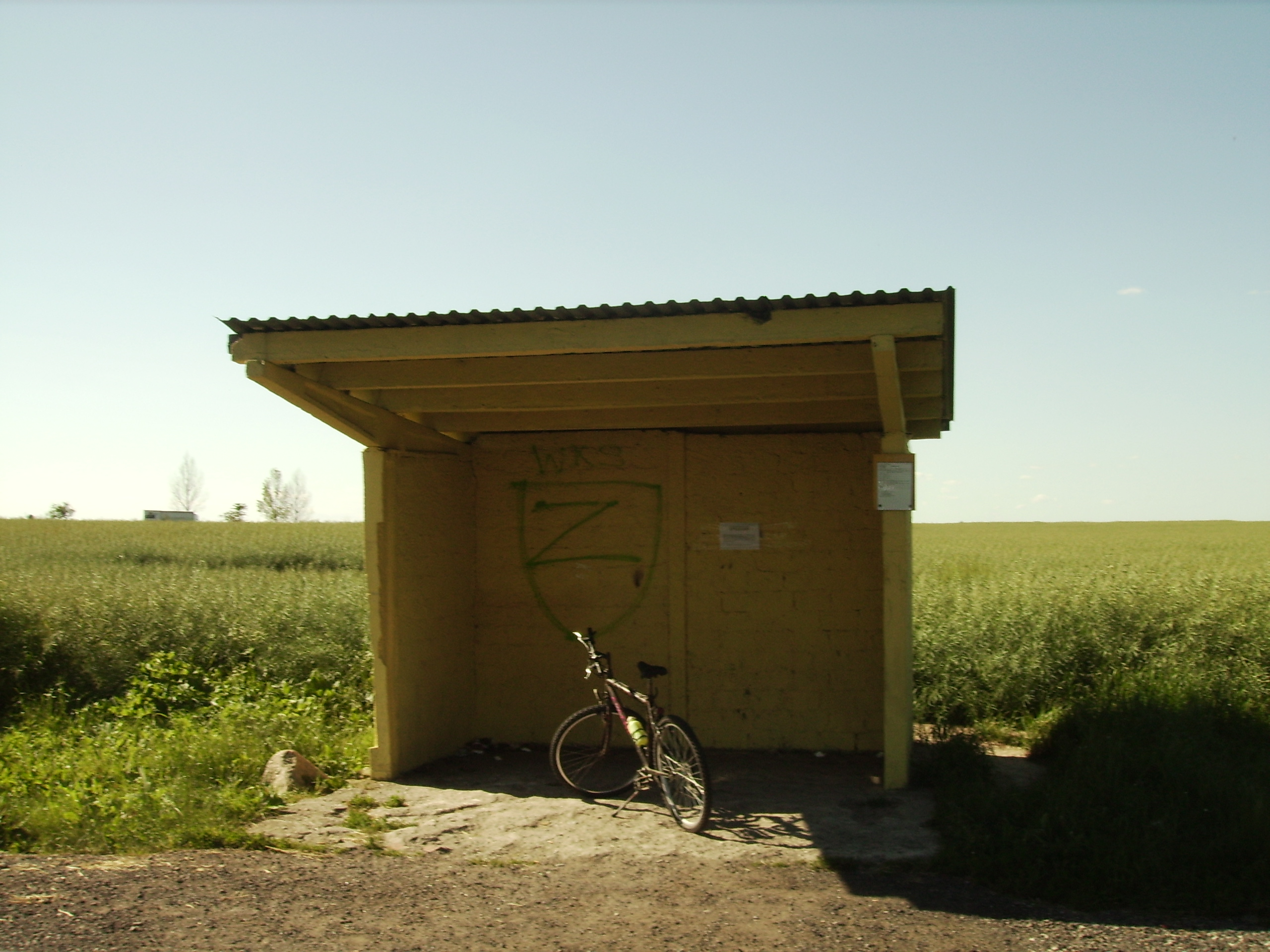
