= Niemczyk, Kuyavian-Pomeranian Voivodeship =

Niemczyk
- Village
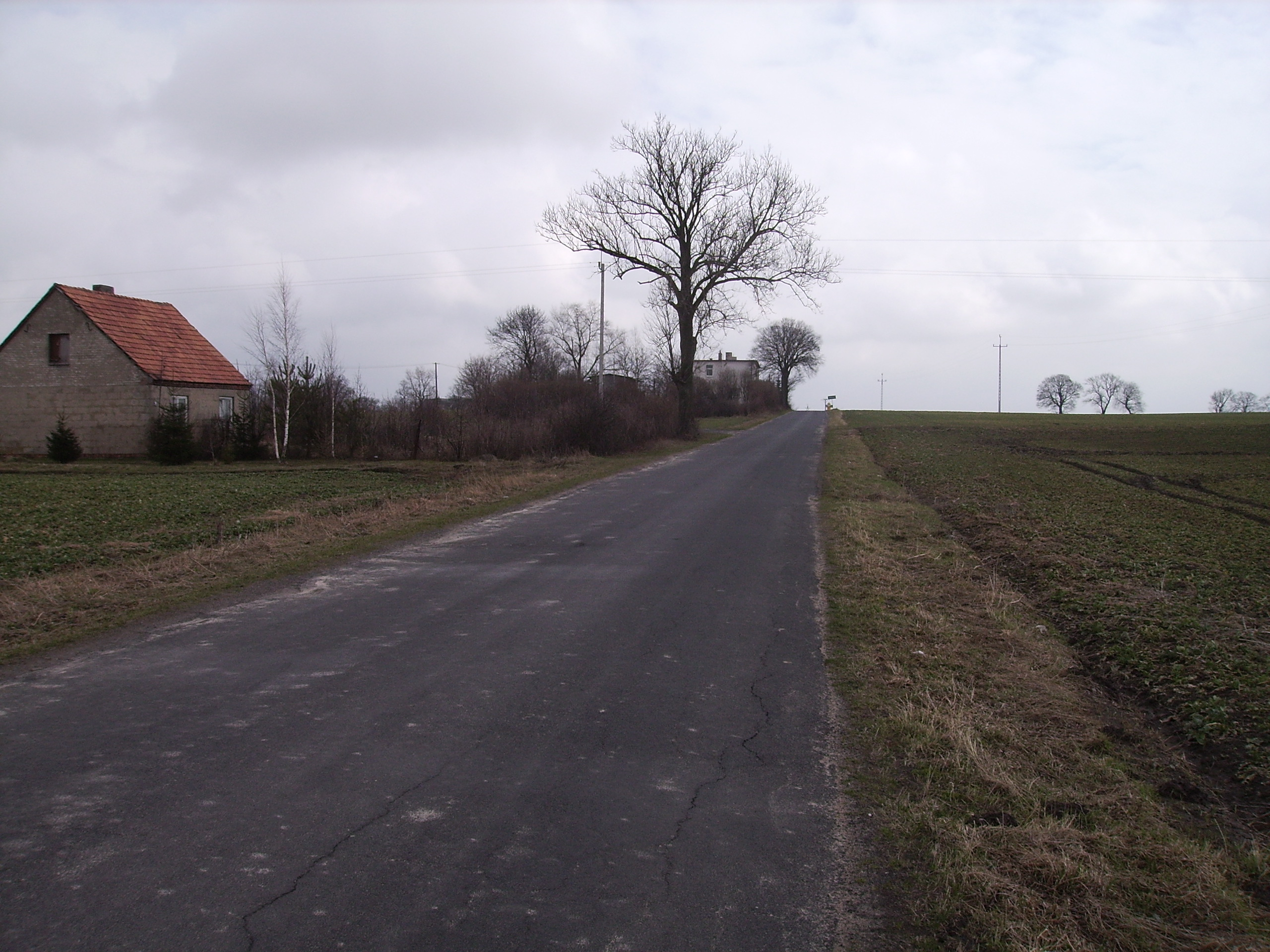

- Location within Poland
- Coordinates: 53°16′07″N 18°36′23″E
- Country: Poland
- Voivodeship: Kuyavian-Pomeranian
- County: Chełmno
- Gmina: Papowo Biskupie

Niemczyk [ˈɲɛmt͡ʂɨk] is a village in the administrative district of Gmina Papowo Biskupie, within Chełmno County, Kuyavian-Pomeranian Voivodeship, in north-central Poland.
