= Dubielno, Chełmno County =

Dubielno
- Village
- Location within Poland
- Coordinates: 53°15′N 18°38′E
- Country: Poland
- Voivodeship: Kuyavian-Pomeranian
- County: Chełmno
- Gmina: Papowo Biskupie

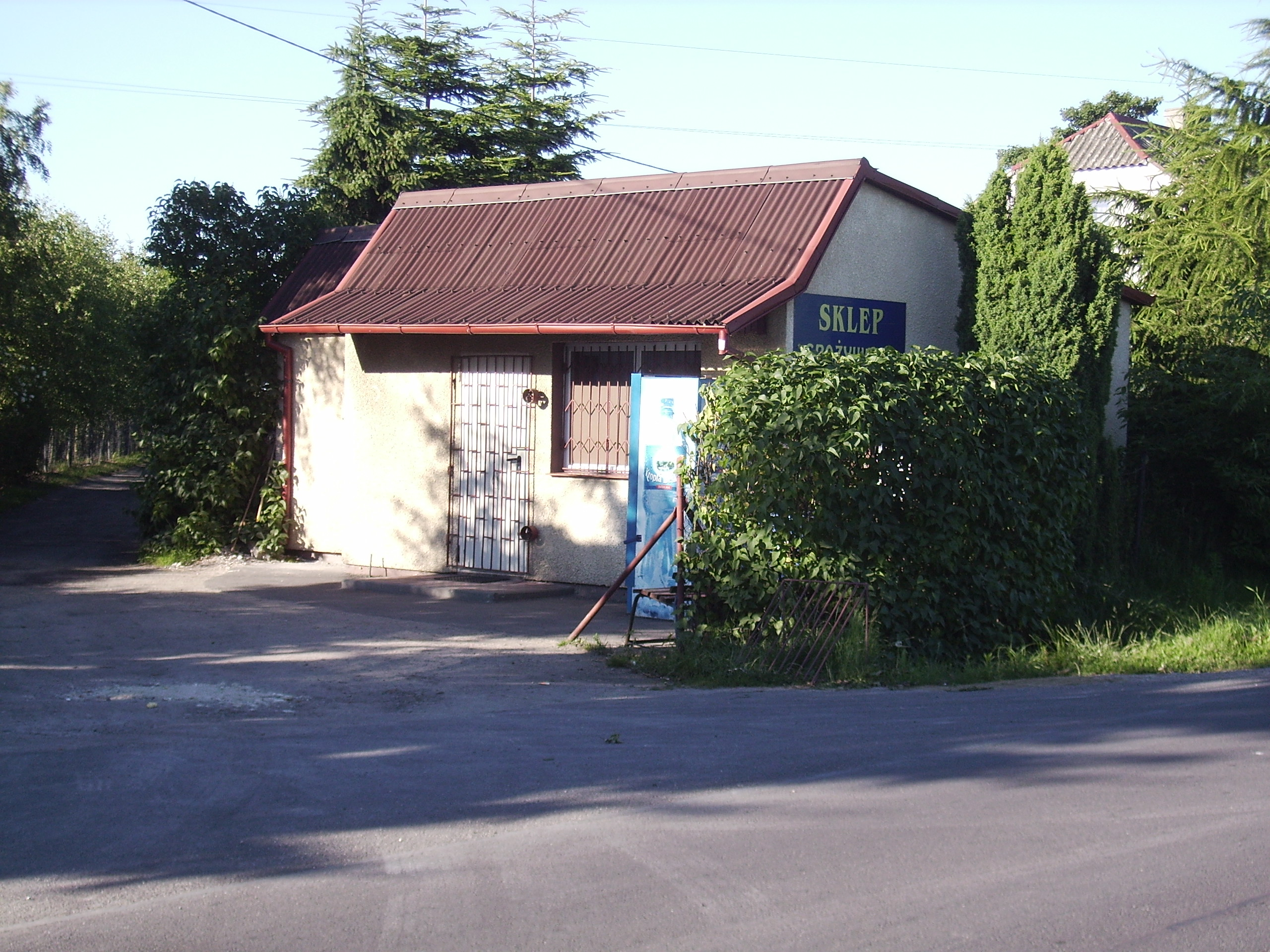
Shop in Dubielno

Dubielno [duˈbjɛlnɔ] is a village in the administrative district of Gmina Papowo Biskupie, within Chełmno County, Kuyavian-Pomeranian Voivodeship, in north-central Poland.

== See also ==
- Chrapice
