= Gmina Papowo Biskupie =

Gmina Papowo Biskupie Papowo Biskupie Commune
- Gmina
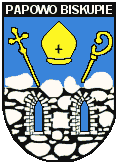
- Coat of arms
- Interactive map of Gmina Papowo Biskupie
- Coordinates (Papowo Biskupie): 53°15′N 18°34′E
- Country: Poland
- Voivodeship: Kuyavian-Pomeranian
- County: Chełmno
- Seat: Papowo Biskupie

Area
  - Total: 70.44 km^{2} (27.20 sq mi)

Population (2006)
  - Total: 4,369
  - Density: 62.02/km^{2} (160.6/sq mi)
- Website: http://www.papowobiskupie.com.pl/

Gmina Papowo Biskupie is a rural gmina (administrative district) in Chełmno County, Kuyavian-Pomeranian Voivodeship, in north-central Poland. Its seat is the village of Papowo Biskupie, which lies approximately 17 kilometres (11 mi) south-east of Chełmno and 25 km (16 mi) north of Toruń.

The gmina covers an area of 70.44 square kilometres (27.2 sq mi), and as of 2006 its total population is 4,369.

== Villages ==
Gmina Papowo Biskupie contains the villages and settlements of Dubielno, Falęcin, Firlus, Folgowo, Jeleniec, Kucborek, Niemczyk, Nowy Dwór Królewski, Papowo Biskupie, Staw, Storlus, Wrocławki, Zegartowice and Żygląd.

== Neighbouring gminas ==
Gmina Papowo Biskupie is bordered by the gminas of Chełmża, Kijewo Królewskie, Lisewo and Stolno.
