= Tornadoes of 2016 =

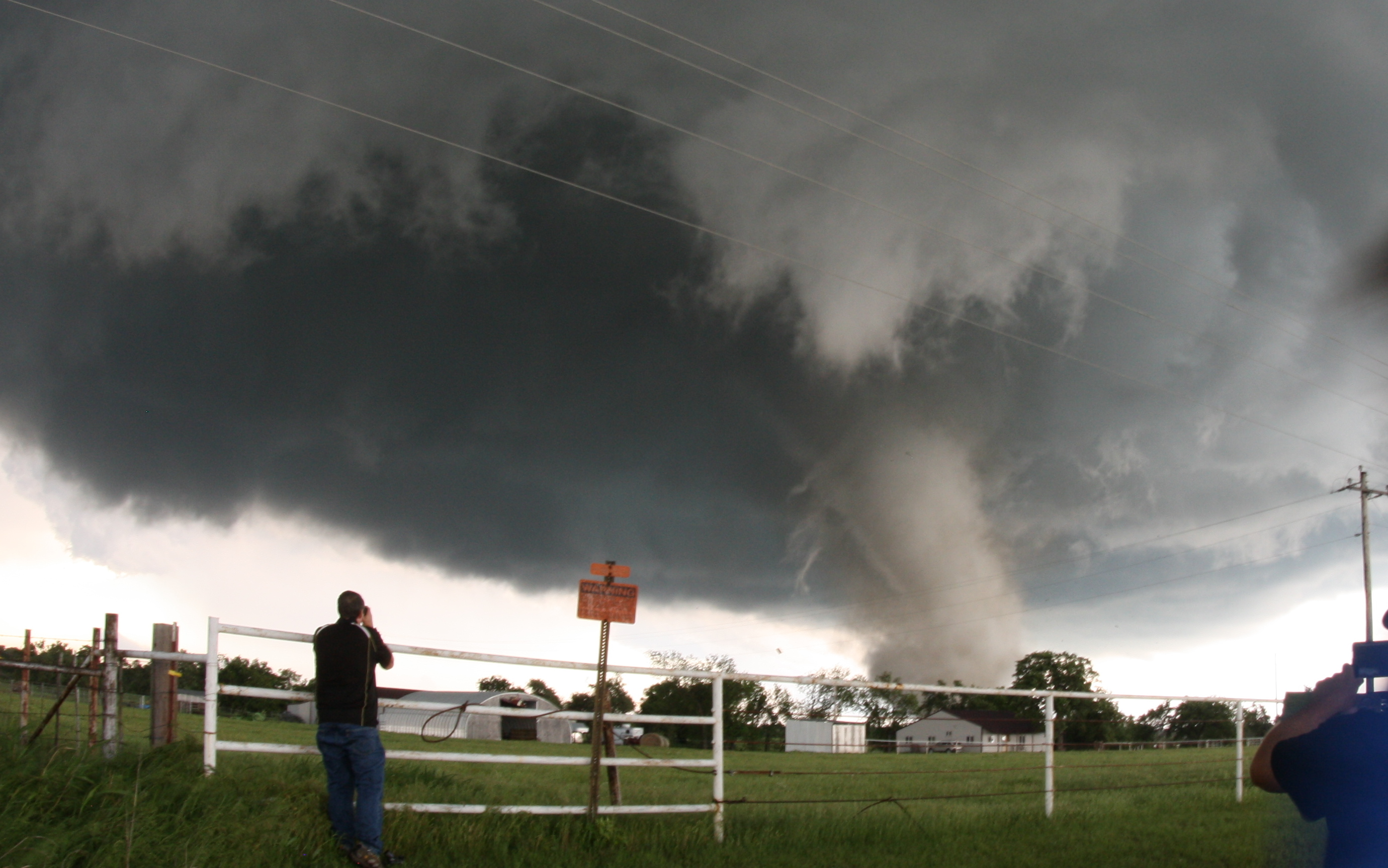
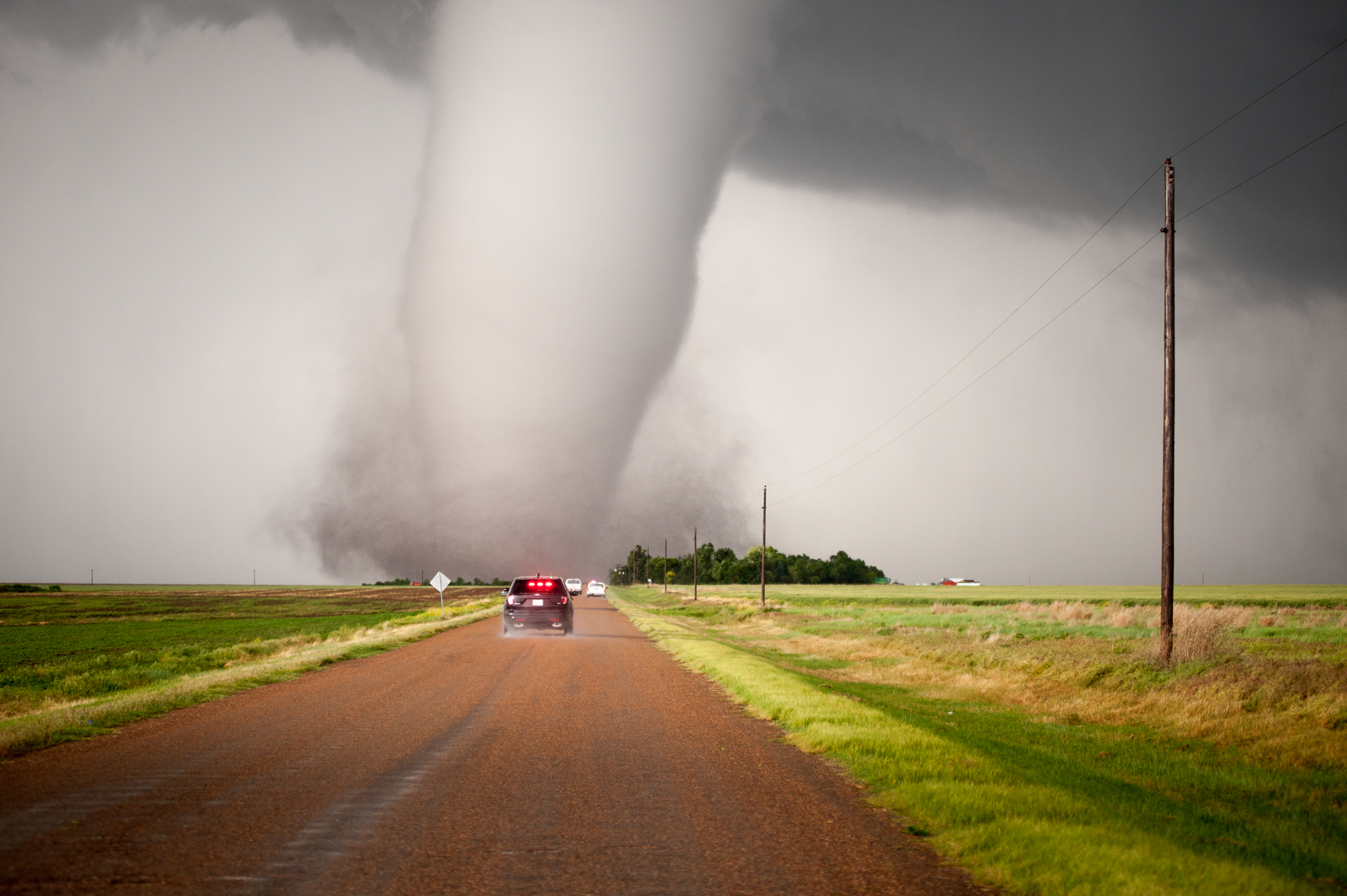
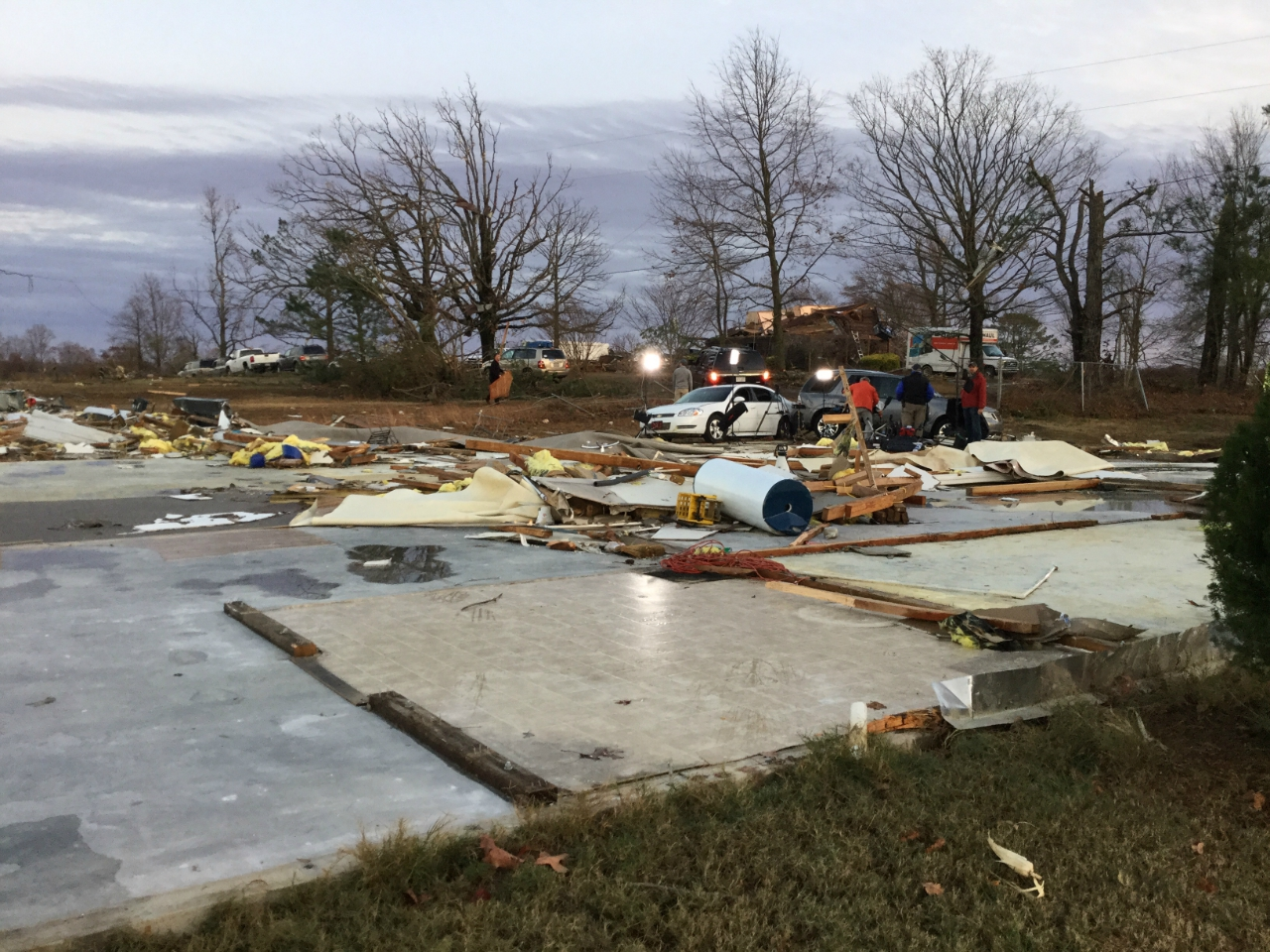
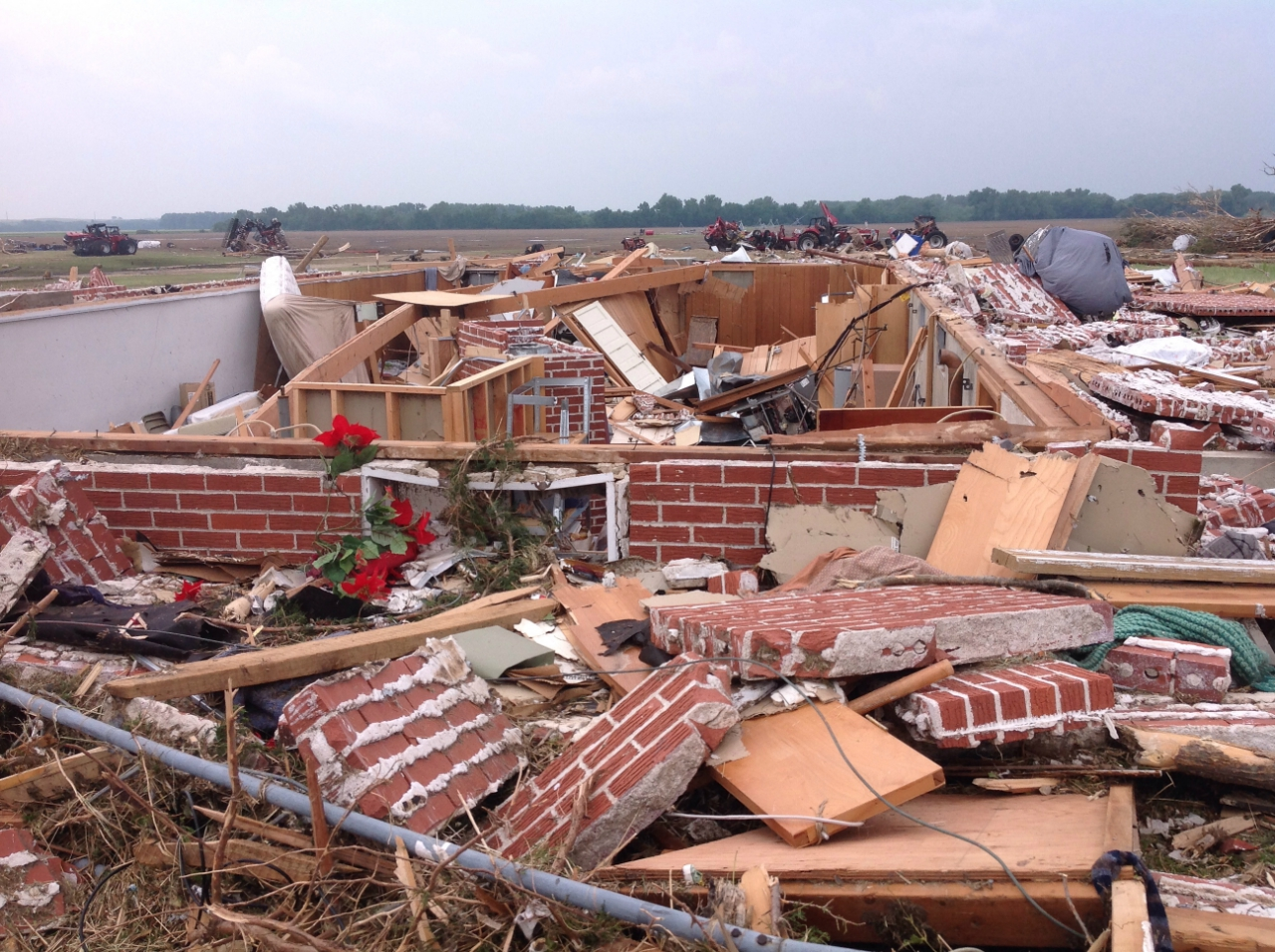
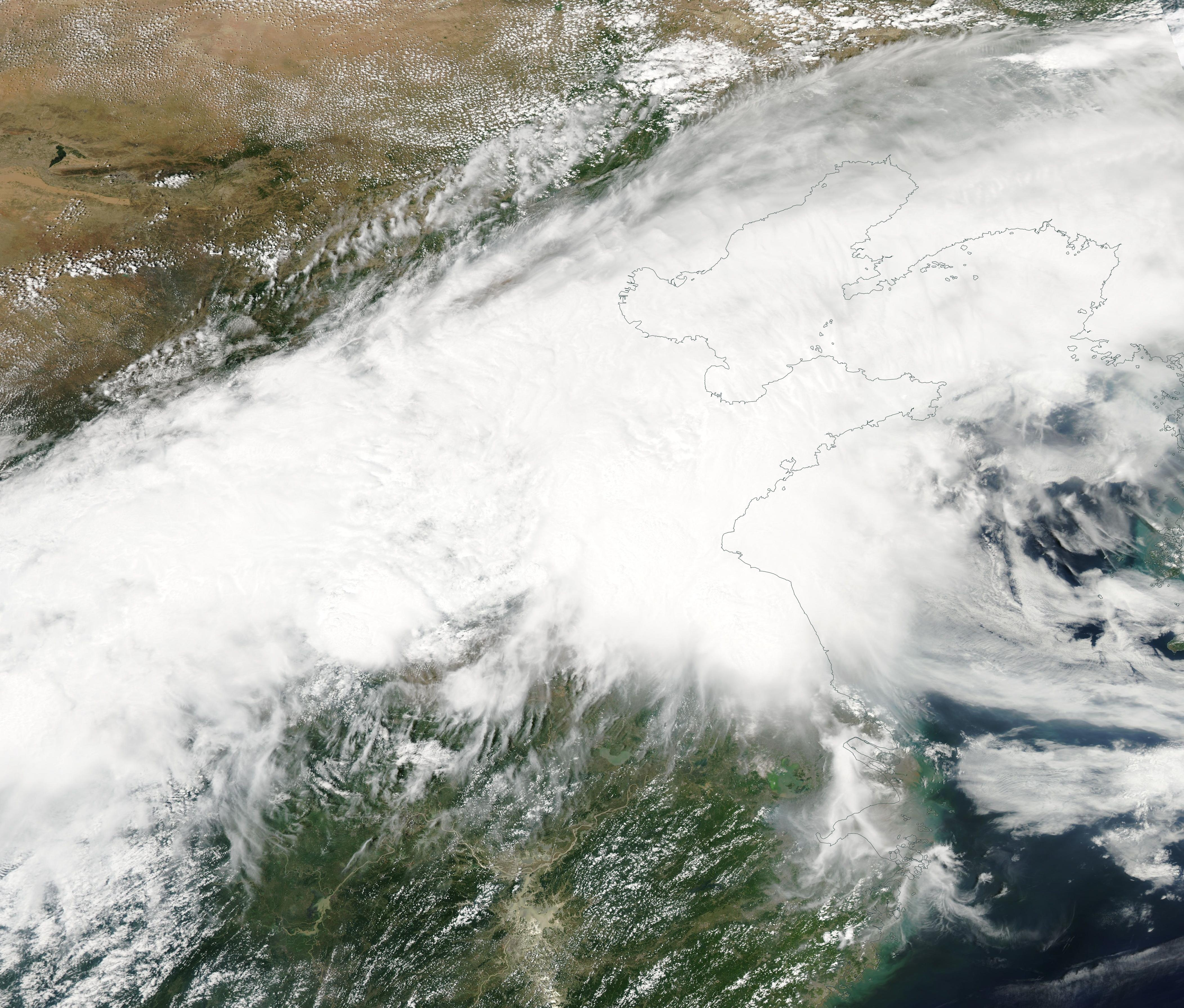
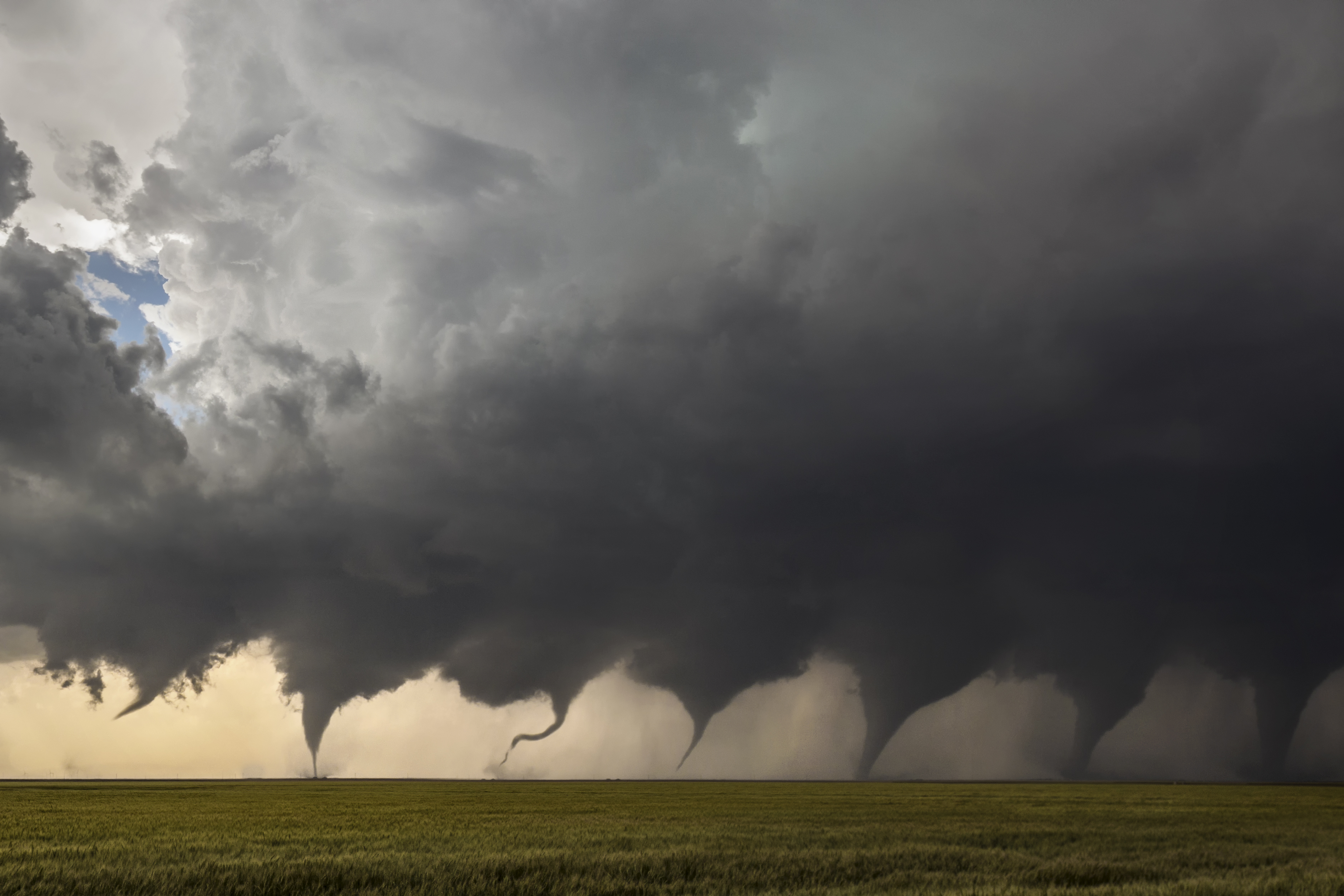
- Clockwise from top: An EF4 tornado near Katie, Oklahoma on May 9; EF3 damage to a daycare center in Ider, Alabama following a tornado on November 30; a storm system in China that produced an enormous tornado in Jiangsu on June 23; Photomontage of an EF3 tornado forming near Minneola, Kansas on May 24; EF4 damage to a home near Chapman, Kansas after a tornado on May 25; An EF2 tornado near Dodge City, Kansas on May 24.
- Timespan: January 6 - December 29
- Maximum rated tornado: EF4 tornado: Katie, Oklahoma on May 9; Chapman, Kansas on May 25; Funing, Jiangsu, China on June 23
- Tornadoes in U.S.: 974
- Damage (U.S.): >$4.1 billion
- Fatalities (U.S.): 18
- Fatalities (worldwide): 133

This page documents notable tornadoes and tornado outbreaks worldwide in 2016. Strong and destructive tornadoes form most frequently in the United States, Bangladesh, Brazil and Eastern India, but they can occur almost anywhere under the right conditions. The Philippines had its most documented tornado in August 14. Tornadoes also develop occasionally in southern Canada during the Northern Hemisphere's summer and somewhat regularly at other times of the year across Europe, Asia, and Australia. Tornadic events are often accompanied with other forms of severe weather, including strong thunderstorms, strong winds, and hail. There were 1,059 tornadoes reported in the United States in 2016, of which 974 were confirmed. Worldwide, 133 fatalities were reported; 100 in China, 18 in the United States, five in Uruguay, four in Brazil and two in Italy, Russia and Indonesia each.

In contrast to the year prior, 2016 was below-average in terms of tornadic activity, recording only 974 tornadoes; however, near-record tornado numbers occurred in February, especially from a late-February outbreak on February 23 and 24. This was the first year that tornadoes began to be rated EFU (EF-Unknown).

== Synopsis ==
Tornado activity was expected to be low during the first quarter of 2016 due to a major El Niño event that would last into early spring. However, this did not come to fruition, as 2016 had the third most active first two months of the past 10 years, only behind 2008 and 2007.

A significant outbreak impacted the southeastern and South Atlantic states on February 23 and 24; 61 confirmed tornadoes occurred, including four which were rated EF3. Seven fatalities occurred as a result of the outbreak. The generally above-average trend continued, to a much lesser degree, throughout the month of March, which saw 84 confirmed tornadoes.

April, by contrast, was below average in terms of tornadic activity, with 142 confirmed tornadoes across the United States in the space of the month. On April 15, a large F3 multiple-vortex tornado struck the city of Dolores in Uruguay, demolishing over 400 buildings and causing five fatalities.

Beginning in May, however, tornado activity increased, with a significant tornado outbreak affecting the central United States from May 7 through May 10, producing the first EF4 tornado of the year. Below average activity occurred during mid-May; however, from May 22 through May 26, another significant outbreak occurred, which produced multiple strong to violent tornadoes. A tornado family impacted southwestern Kansas near Dodge City in the evening of May 24; five of the tornadoes were rated EF3, though no fatalities occurred. The most significant tornado of the event was a high-end EF4 wedge tornado which tracked through Ottawa and Dickinson Counties in central Kansas. A split-level home to the north of Abilene was swept away; numerous vehicles including a Freightliner truck and a combine harvester were tossed and mangled beyond recognition, and a set of railroad tracks near Chapman were bent horizontally. An additional 11 tornadoes were confirmed on May 26; however, most were weak.

June was well below average in terms of tornadic activity; 90 tornadoes were reported over the course of the month, of which 87 were confirmed. In the evening of June 11, an EF3 tornado impacted the city of Baker, Montana, demolishing several homes and a steel-framed barn. In the early afternoon of June 23, an isolated violent tornado impacted the outskirts of Yancheng in the Jiangsu province of China, where numerous homes were leveled, several vehicles were tossed, cell phone towers were destroyed, and trees were completely debarked and denuded. The China Meteorological Association assigned the tornado a rating of EF4.

July saw near-average tornadic activity throughout the United States, with 104 tornadoes being reported over the course of the month, though no significant outbreaks occurred. Tornadic activity in August was near average in the United States, with 92 tornadoes having been reported as of August 27; however, on the evening of August 24, a rare outbreak of tornadoes impacted the states of Indiana and Ohio, along with the Canadian province of Ontario, with significant damage occurring in and around Kokomo, Indiana, Woodburn, Indiana, and Windsor, Ontario. The outbreak caused relatively few injuries and no fatalities.

Generally average to below average tornado activity occurred for the remainder of the year.

== Events ==
=== United States ===
Confirmed tornadoes by Enhanced Fujita rating
EFU	EF0	EF1	EF2	EF3	EF4	EF5	Total
30	530	311	75	26	2	0	974

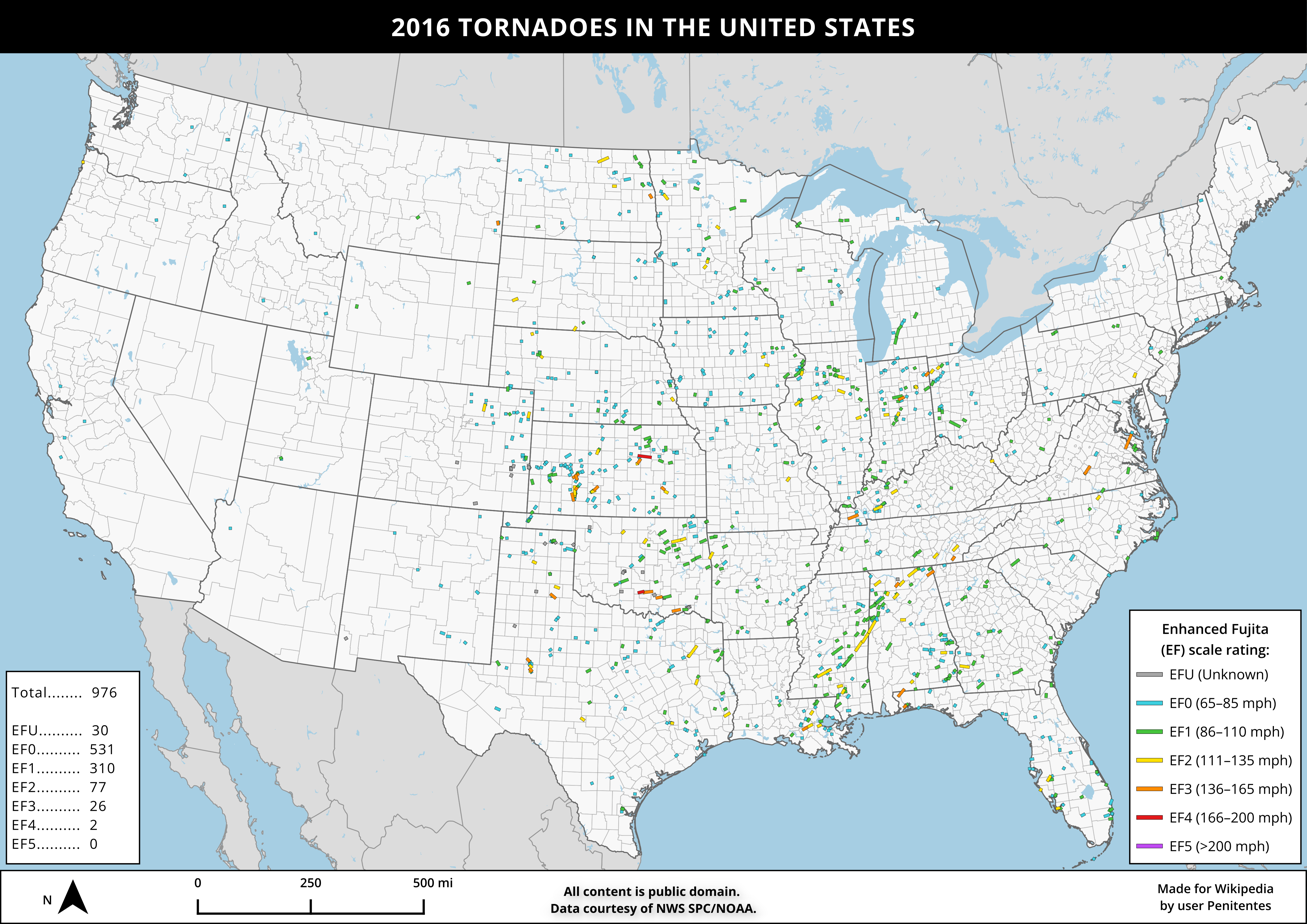
A map of 2016 United States tornado paths from the results of storm surveys.

A chart of the 2016 United States tornado count estimated from the number of preliminary reports

Fatal tornadoes in the United States in 2016
- Approximate touchdown location of killer tornadoes in 2016 Summary of tornadoes: January 17 – Florida (2 deaths); February 23 – Louisiana (2 deaths); February 23 – Mississippi (1 death); February 24 – Virginia (3 deaths); February 24 – Virginia (1 death); April 27 – Texas (1 death); May 9 – Oklahoma (1 death); May 9 – Oklahoma (1 death); November 30 – Tennessee (2 deaths); November 30 – Alabama (4 deaths); Total fatalities: 18

== January ==
=== January 16–17 (Florida) ===
EFU	EF0	EF1	EF2	EF3	EF4	EF5
0	0	1	2	0	0	0

Several tornadoes were reported in the Tampa Bay area late in the evening of January 16 and into the early morning of January 17. The most significant tornado of the event, rated EF2, completely destroyed a mobile home and caused severe damage to a barn in the Duette area, resulting in two fatalities. Another high-end EF2 tornado damaged numerous structures in Siesta Key, including one home that had its second floor completely destroyed.

=== January 21–22 (United States) ===
EFU	EF0	EF1	EF2	EF3	EF4	EF5
0	2	3	1	0	0	0

Six tornadoes touched down across the Deep South, five of which occurred in Mississippi. The strongest tornado of the event was a low-end EF2 tornado near Sumrall, which caused considerable damage to a house and a garage.

== February ==
=== February 2–3 (United States) ===
EFU	EF0	EF1	EF2	EF3	EF4	EF5
0	3	8	3	0	0	0

Several tornadoes were reported across western Alabama and eastern Mississippi on February 2, including a large wedge tornado that struck Collinsville, Mississippi, tearing roofs off homes in the town and causing major structural damage at a church complex. Another EF2 tornado struck the west side of Scooba, causing damage to homes and the East Mississippi Community College campus. The most significant tornado of the day was a very high-end EF2 wedge tornado that destroyed numerous mobile homes and heavily damaged frame homes near McMullen, Alabama before it struck the nearby town of Carrollton, downing many trees. The following day, a high-end EF1 tornado caused considerable damage at Fort Stewart, Georgia. Overall, the event produced 14 tornadoes and no fatalities.

=== February 15–16 (United States) ===
EFU	EF0	EF1	EF2	EF3	EF4	EF5
0	9	12	2	1	0	0

A small but damaging tornado outbreak impacted Florida and the Gulf Coast region of the United States. The event began on February 15, as multiple tornadoes affected an area extending from Louisiana to the Florida Panhandle. This included a high-end EF2 tornado that caused major damage in and around Wesson, Mississippi. Later that evening, a large EF3 tornado struck the town of Century, Florida and destroyed numerous homes and mobile homes in the area. An EF1 tornado caused considerable damage in Sylvarena, Mississippi, while an EF2 tornado completely destroyed a volunteer fire department building in Johnsonville, Alabama. Tornado activity continued the following day, as a few weak tornadoes occurred in the Miami metropolitan area and in North Carolina as well. The outbreak resulted in a total of 24 tornadoes and no fatalities.

=== February 23–24 (United States) ===
EFU	EF0	EF1	EF2	EF3	EF4	EF5
0	23	29	5	4	0	0

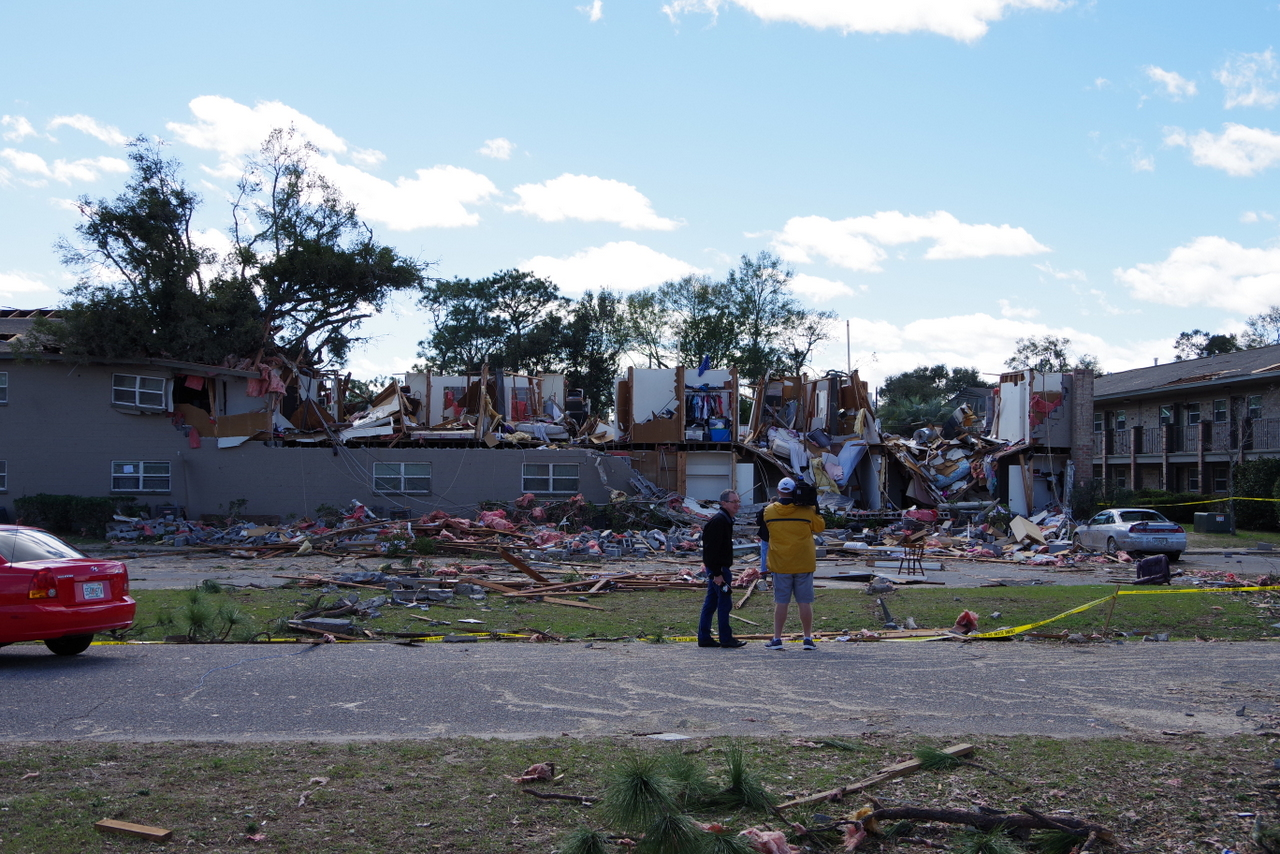
EF3 damage to an apartment building in Pensacola, Florida.

The second largest February tornado outbreak on record impacted the Gulf Coast and East Coast regions of the United States beginning on February 23. The first significant tornadoes of the outbreak moved across southeastern Louisiana and southern Mississippi that evening, leaving significant damage and three deaths. The towns of Livingston and Laplace, Louisiana sustained heavy damage from strong EF2 tornadoes, and another EF2 near Purvis, Mississippi killed one person in a mobile home. An EF3 tornado also caused major structural damage in Paincourtville, Louisiana before destroying an RV park in Convent, killing two people at that location. Three simultaneous waterspouts were observed over Lake Pontchartrain during the event as well. Later that night, a large supercell thunderstorm developed over the Gulf of Mexico and moved ashore, producing a destructive EF3 tornado in the northern part of Pensacola, Florida. The tornado injured three people and destroyed homes, townhouses, apartments, and a GE warehouse.

The outbreak continued the following day as strong tornadoes impacted the East Coast states of Virginia, Pennsylvania, and North Carolina on February 24, killing four people. An EF1 tornado struck the town of Waverly, Virginia, killing three people in a mobile home, including a two-year-old child. An EF3 tornado struck the town of Evergreen, Virginia, causing severe damage and killing one person at that location. An EF2 tornado caused major damage to homes near Oxford, North Carolina, and another EF2 tornado touched down near White Horse, Pennsylvania, damaging up to 50 structures in the area. Another long-tracked EF3 tornado occurred later that night near the Virginia town of Tappahannock, destroying multiple homes along its path. About 35,000 people in Virginia, 4,000 in Washington, D.C., and 47,000 in the Carolinas lost power due to the storms. In all, there were 61 tornadoes and seven fatalities during the outbreak.

== March ==
=== March 1 (United States) ===
EFU	EF0	EF1	EF2	EF3	EF4	EF5
0	2	0	1	0	0	0

An EF2 tornado struck the McCalla, Alabama area, causing major damage to numerous homes and injuring four people. An EF0 tornado caused minor tree damage in the northern part of Opelika, Alabama, and another EF0 tornado near Sylacauga, Alabama caused minor damage to homes and destroyed outbuildings.

=== March 15 (United States) ===
EFU	EF0	EF1	EF2	EF3	EF4	EF5
0	3	3	3	0	0	0

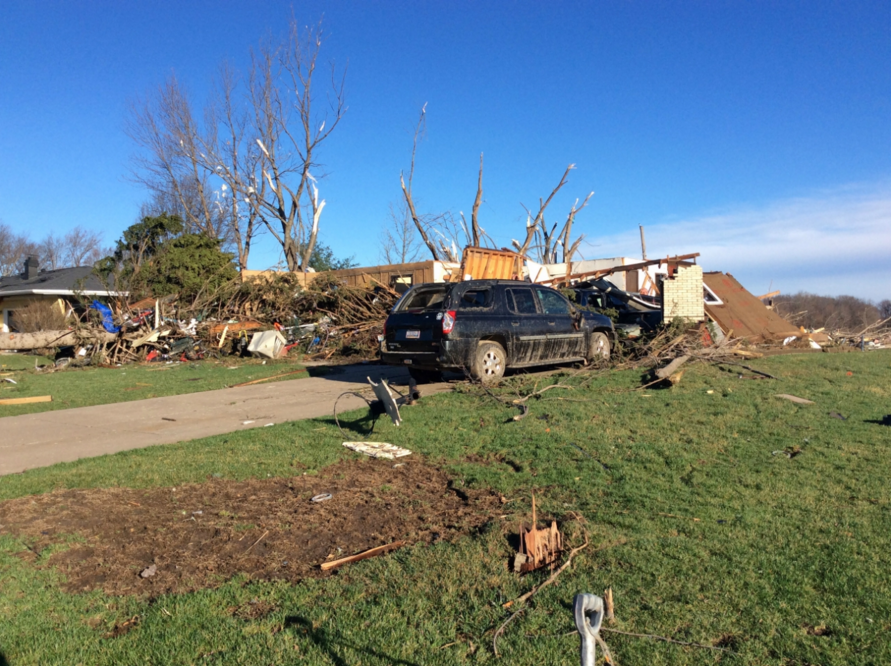
High-end EF2 damage to a house on the outskirts of East Moline, Illinois.

During the morning of March 15, the Storm Prediction Center introduced an enhanced risk of severe thunderstorms for west central Illinois, southeastern Iowa, and northeastern Missouri, with a 10% chance of tornadoes for the same areas. The enhanced risk area was expanded westward in subsequent outlooks. That night, a small tornado outbreak occurred in eastern Iowa and western Illinois. A high-end EF2 tornado tracked near Rapids City, Illinois, injuring 10 people and destroying homes in a semi-rural subdivision near East Moline, while an EF0 touched down near McCausland, Iowa, causing minor tree damage. Another EF2 tornado caused considerable damage near Trivoli, Illinois in Peoria County, and an EF0 tornado caused damage in the city of Peoria and Peoria Heights. An EF1 tornado near Curran, Illinois caused damage to homes west of Springfield, and another EF0 tornado touched down north of Deer Grove, Illinois. A large tornado touched down in Good Hope, Illinois, initially causing EF0 roof damage in town before reaching EF2 strength further to the northeast, heavily damaging multiple farmsteads. Two other EF1 tornadoes touched down in Clinton County, Iowa, one of which struck a mobile home park near Low Moor, injuring three people. A total of nine tornadoes were confirmed from this event.

=== March 30 – April 1 (United States) ===
EFU	EF0	EF1	EF2	EF3	EF4	EF5
0	6	20	3	0	0	0

Early in the evening of March 30, a localized but significant tornado event impacted Oklahoma and Arkansas, including an EF2 tornado that caused heavy damage to homes, businesses, and industrial buildings in the northern part of Tulsa, injuring four people. A second EF2 tornado from the same parent supercell severely damaged homes near Claremore, and destroyed barns at Will Rogers Downs. The following day, numerous weak tornadoes touched down in southern Middle Tennessee, Mississippi and Alabama, causing mostly minor damage. However, an EF2 tornado destroyed mobile homes and downed many trees near Hartselle and Priceville, Alabama. Tornado activity continued on the morning of April 1, as a few weak tornadoes occurred in parts of Alabama and Georgia. The system also produced heavy rain, flooding, and hail across the Southern Plains and Southeastern United States. Two non-tornadic deaths occurred due to teen drivers sliding and crashing on a wet roadways in Tishomingo County, Mississippi and Douglas County. Overall, this outbreak produced 29 tornadoes and no tornadic fatalities.

== April ==
=== April 15 (Uruguay) ===
On April 15, a large and destructive F3 wedge tornado struck the city of Dolores, Uruguay, destroying at least 400 homes and buildings. Brick businesses in downtown Dolores sustained major structural damage, and streets were left covered in bricks and debris from collapsed walls and structures. Several cars were crushed by falling masonry, and others were thrown into buildings or tossed considerable distances and mangled. A large brick church was almost completely leveled, with only a few sections of its outer walls left standing, and several industrial buildings were destroyed as well. Residential areas in town were also devastated, with numerous well-built homes severely damaged or destroyed, and many trees and power lines downed. The National Emergency System reported five people dead and also more than 250 injured. Uruguay declared a state of emergency for the city of Dolores in the wake of the tornado. Storms, including floods, affected the rest of the country, with five more deaths in other areas.

=== April 26–27 (United States) ===
EFU	EF0	EF1	EF2	EF3	EF4	EF5
0	25	32	0	0	0	0

On April 26 and 27, a large but weak tornado outbreak occurred across a large portion of the Great Plains. On the afternoon of April 26, the Storm Prediction Center issued a PDS tornado watch for most of the state of Oklahoma as well as portions of central Texas. A 10% hatched risk area for tornadoes extended from Nebraska to Texas, and multiple intense tornadoes were expected. However, the wind profile that evening did not support sustained supercell thunderstorms. As a result, only scattered weak tornadoes occurred, though EF1 tornadoes caused minor to moderate damage in parts of Oklahoma City and Tulsa. Weak tornado activity continued the following day in Nebraska, Iowa, Illinois, Missouri, and Kentucky, including an EF0 and an EF1 that caused minor damage in the western part of Omaha. An early morning EF0 blew a large tree over onto a mobile home near Tomball, Texas, killing an elderly woman inside. Overall, the outbreak produced at least 57 tornadoes and one death.

=== April 29–30 (United States) ===
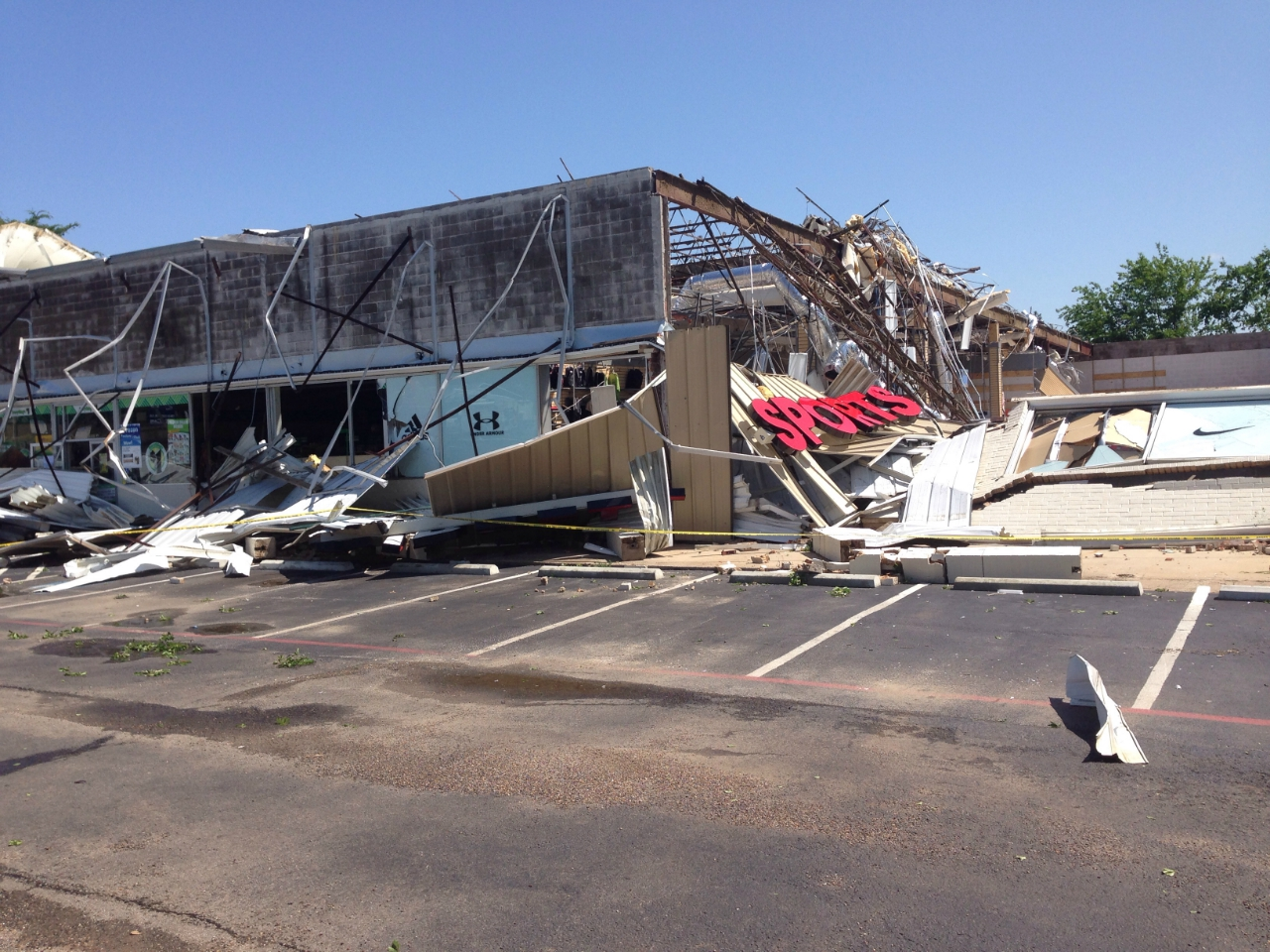
EF2 damage to a sporting goods store in Lindale, Texas.

EFU	EF0	EF1	EF2	EF3	EF4	EF5
0	2	9	4	0	0	0

A storm system produced 15 tornadoes across parts of Oklahoma and Texas on the evening of April 29 and the following day. Two EF1 tornadoes destroyed mobile homes near Fletcher and Ninnekah, Oklahoma, and an EF2 tornado caused major damage to some businesses in Lindale, Texas. The parent supercell that produced the Lindale tornado went on to produce a very large and long-track EF2 tornado that knocked over a cell phone tower, destroyed mobile homes, and severely damaged a frame home to the east of town. Another EF2 tornado damaged 27 homes near Alto, completely tearing the roofs off of two of them and destroying two travel trailers as well. A fourth EF2 tornado injured three people on April 30 when it completely destroyed a mobile home near Call, Texas.

== May ==
=== May 7–10 (United States) ===
EFU	EF0	EF1	EF2	EF3	EF4	EF5
6	34	12	6	4	1	0

A significant tornado outbreak occurred across an area extending from Colorado to Kentucky, beginning with a large multiple-vortex EF2 tornado that tossed several RVs and injured two people near Wiggins, Colorado on May 7. Later that evening, a large stovepipe tornado caused high-end EF2 damage near Wray, while several other tornadoes tracked across other very rural areas of Colorado, causing no damage. Scattered tornadoes occurred on May 8, most of which were weak. However, a strong EF2 tornado caused considerable damage to outbuildings and high-voltage transmission line poles near Catharine, Kansas. On May 9, a significant tornado event unfolded across Oklahoma, as several strong to violent tornadoes touched down and caused severe damage in several parts of the state. A violent EF4 stovepipe tornado near Katie, Oklahoma killed one person, leveled and swept away multiple homes, and left behind an extensive swath of ground scouring, while a large EF3 wedge tornado from the same parent supercell caused major damage near Sulphur. An EF3 tornado that tracked from near Connerville to Bromide destroyed a house and killed one person. An extremely large EF3 multiple-vortex tornado reached a maximum width of about 1.8 miles (2.9 km) as it passed near Boswell, snapping and denuding numerous trees, destroying mobile homes, heavily damaging frame homes, and toppling two large metal power line truss towers along its path. Other strong tornadoes occurred as far north as Nebraska, including an EF2 tornado that tore the roof and some exterior walls from a home near Nehawka and injured one person. An EF1 tornado also caused minor damage in residential areas of Lincoln. Significant tornado activity continued on May 10, as several tornadoes moved across areas of western Kentucky, including an EF3 tornado that injured 10 people as it moved through the north edge of Mayfield, Kentucky, destroying numerous homes, vehicles, and businesses. Another tornado caused EF2 damage near Hartford. Overall, this outbreak killed two people and produced 57 tornadoes.

=== May 13–15 (Europe) ===
FU	F0	F1	F2	F3	F4	F5
4	6	10	3	1	0	0

A significant three-day tornado outbreak produced many tornadoes across several countries in Europe in mid-May 2016, several of which were strong. The first tornado of the outbreak occurred in Russia and was an F0 tornado that caused minor roof damage in the Lebedevka area, while another F0 tornado occurred near Kletskaya. In Austria, the town of Großdietmanns was struck by an F0 tornado, which caused minor tree damage and lofted lightweight outdoor objects. Numerous tornadoes touched down on May 14, mainly in western Russia, the strongest of which was an intense, long-tracked F3 tornado that caused significant damage along a 56 km (35 mi) path through Rostov Oblast, injuring five people in the process. The tornado struck the small villages of Razdol'nyy and Il'inka, damaging or destroying over 100 homes. A maintenance workshop was destroyed, and several electrical transmission towers were downed. Livestock was killed, cars were thrown, and numerous large trees were snapped or uprooted by the tornado as well. An F1 tornado also downed trees and damaged the roofs of 25 homes in and around Talove. Near Morozovsk, a large multiple-vortex F2 tornado twisted and broke power line pylons, while another F2 tornado completely destroyed a grain warehouse, inflicted major roof damage to structures, and downed many trees and power lines near Nizhnyaya Verbovka. Numerous other F0 and F1 tornadoes caused minor to moderate damage across Russia later that afternoon and evening. In Turkey, a damaging F2 tornado struck Karadedeoğlu in Kastamonu Province, destroying three homes and damaging 40 others in the town. Trees, power lines, vehicles, and solar panels were also damaged by the tornado. On May 15, an F0 tornado briefly touched down in Dallgow-Döberitz, Germany, causing minor damage to roofs and garden sheds. A few other weak tornadoes occurred in Russia, Ukraine, and Romania as well. A total 24 tornadoes were confirmed as a result of this outbreak, none of which resulted in any fatalities.

=== May 15 (Brazil) ===
Two nighttime F2 tornadoes affected rural areas in the state of Santa Catarina in southern Brazil, destroying homes and cars. The tornadoes caused four deaths and 21 injuries.

=== May 22–26 (United States) ===
EFU	EF0	EF1	EF2	EF3	EF4	EF5
4	52	24	9	8	1	0

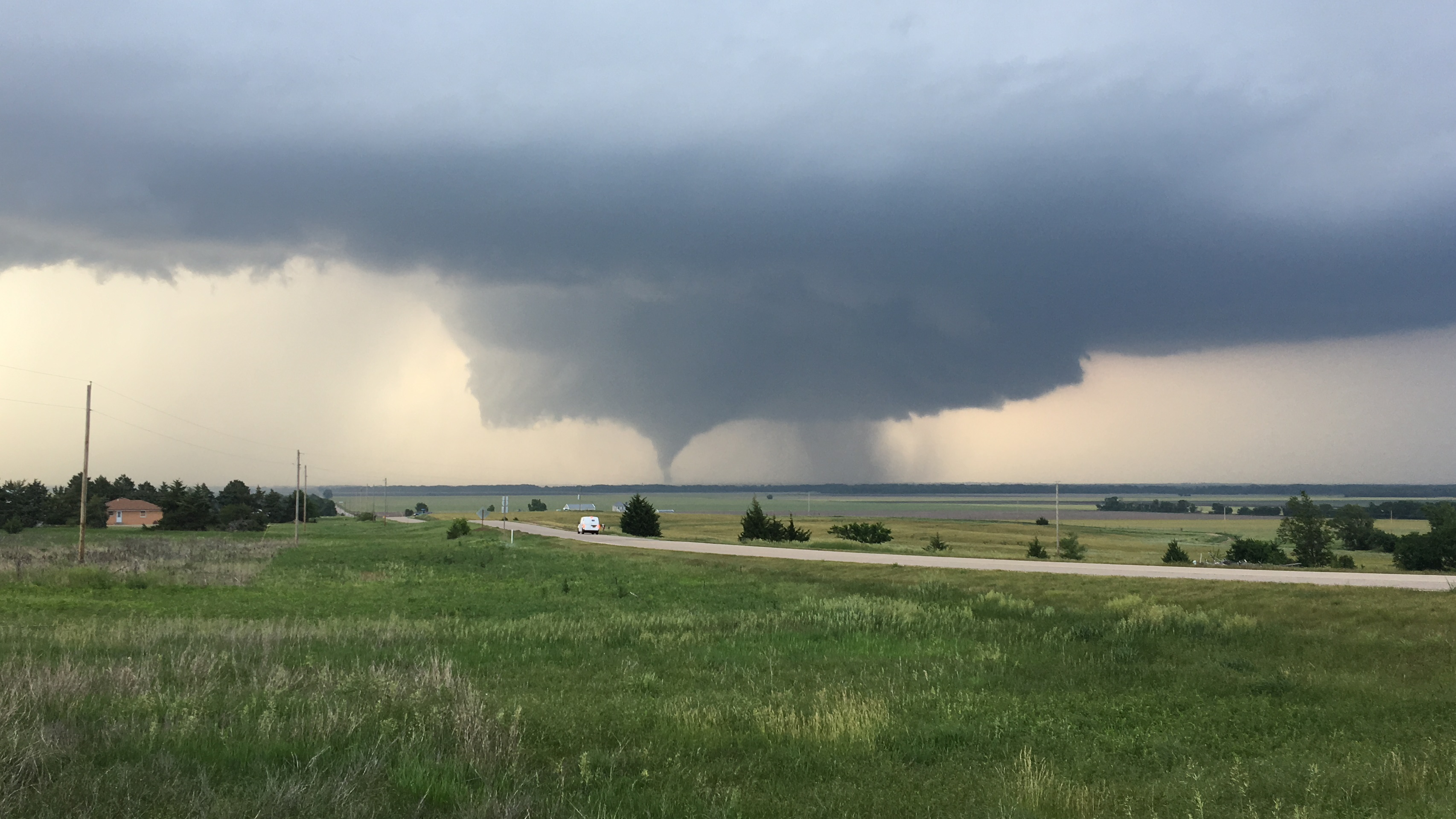
The EF4 Abilene–Chapman, Kansas tornado shortly after formation.

During the week of May 22–27, a southwards dip in the jet stream occurred in the West near Colorado, with favorable thermodynamics advecting northwards and setting the potential for a tornado outbreak. In the early afternoon of May 22, an Enhanced risk was issued by the Storm Prediction Center for extreme southwestern Kansas, the Oklahoma Panhandle, and northern Texas. Numerous tornadoes touched down along the dryline that evening, with the strongest tornadoes touching down in Texas. This included a large, rain wrapped EF3 tornado that destroyed homes and vehicles near Big Spring. Another EF3 tornado destroyed oil pump jacks near Garden City, while two EF2 tornadoes in the same general area snapped numerous trees and power poles, damaged additional pump jacks, and destroyed a mobile home. Less widespread tornado activity occurred on May 23, with mainly scattered weak tornadoes occurring across central and southern Plains. However, a large nighttime wedge tornado caused EF3 damage to metal power poles near Turkey, Texas that night.

A significant outbreak of strong tornadoes affected Kansas on May 24. A single cyclic supercell produced nearly a dozen highly visible tornadoes near Dodge City, with several reports of multiple tornadoes on the ground simultaneously. A total of five EF3 tornadoes and three EF2 tornadoes were confirmed in western Kansas that evening, affecting rural areas near Dodge City, Jetmore, Ness City, Lewis, and Kinsley. Scattered weak tornadoes were also observed across other parts of Kansas and other states as well. Less significant activity was expected on May 25, and only a few tornadoes occurred, though this included a half-mile wide EF4 wedge tornado that tracked from near Solomon to east of Chapman, Kansas. This violent tornado obliterated farm homes, debarked trees, bent railroad tracks, and mangled farm machinery and vehicles beyond recognition, though only eight minor injuries occurred along the path. Another significant outbreak of tornadoes occurred was expected to occur across Kansas on May 26, and a Moderate Risk with a 15% hatched risk area for tornadoes was issued by the Storm Prediction Center. Despite this, early initiation of storms combined with an unfavorable wind profile prevented a significant outbreak from occurring. However, a few notable tornadoes did touchdown. A high-end EF1 tornado caused considerable damage in Bryan, Texas, while EF2 and EF1 tornadoes occurred simultaneously near Navasota, resulting in heavy damage. Despite producing numerous strong to violent tornadoes, this outbreak sequence only affected rural areas, resulting in no fatalities and few injuries. In all, 98 tornadoes were confirmed as a result of the outbreak sequence.

== June ==
=== June 5 (China) ===
On June 5, a strong stovepipe tornado occurred in Hainan Province in China. The tornado struck nine small villages near the town of Fengpozhen, located to the north of Wenchang. Masonry homes sustained major structural damage, including some that had their roofs torn off and exterior walls collapsed. Numerous large trees were snapped, uprooted, or denuded as well. A total of 178 homes were damaged or destroyed by the tornado, which was rated EF3. One person was killed, and 11 others were injured.

=== June 11 (Montana) ===
On the evening of June 11, an isolated EF3 tornado struck the town of Baker, Montana, destroying six homes and damaging at least 50 more. Many trees were snapped, denuded, and stripped of foliage. Several horses were killed, and six people were injured.

=== June 22–23 (United States) ===
EFU	EF0	EF1	EF2	EF3	EF4	EF5
0	7	13	3	0	0	0

A moderate outbreak of mostly weak tornadoes impacted the Ohio Valley region beginning on the evening of June 22, and continuing into the early morning hours of June 23. Most of the tornadoes occurred in Illinois. An EF1 tornado struck the town of Troy Grove, Illinois, downing numerous trees and tree limbs throughout town. Another EF1 tornado struck the northeastern part of Cissna Park, damaging trees, power poles, homes, outbuildings, and a baseball dugout. Near Seneca, an EF2 tornado crumpled four metal truss towers, damaged homes, and destroyed outbuildings. Another EF2 tornado clipped the southwestern edge of Pontiac, heavily damaging a few businesses, snapping power poles, destroying a mobile home, and injuring four people. Significant tornado activity pushed into Indiana early the next morning, with two tornadoes, rated EF1 and EF2 respectively, causing structural damage to homes and destroying outbuildings near Huntington. In Ohio, a long-tracked EF1 tornado touched down in Waynesville before lifting in Wilmington, damaging trees, homes, outbuildings, and a convenience store along its path. Overall, this outbreak produced 23 tornadoes, but no fatalities occurred.

=== June 23 (China) ===
EFU	EF0	EF1	EF2	EF3	EF4	EF5
1	0	0	0	0	1	0

A massive, violent and devastating EF4 wedge tornado produced catastrophic damage as it impacted the Funing area of Yancheng in Jiangsu Province, China on the afternoon of June 23. Thousands of masonry construction homes were destroyed, many of which were leveled. Trees were debarked, vehicles were tossed and destroyed, multi-ton metal shipping containers were lofted through the air, and metal power line pylons and truss towers were bent to the ground. Schools and manufacturing plants sustained major damage as well. There were 98 fatalities and 846 injuries, many of them critically. The tornado traveled approximately 33 kilometres (21 mi) from Banhuzhen to Wutanzhen, with a maximum width of about 4.10 kilometres (2.55 mi) making it one of the widest tornadoes on record. A tornado of unknown intensity also caused damage and one death in the Sheyang area as well.

== July ==
=== July 7 (United States) ===
EFU	EF0	EF1	EF2	EF3	EF4	EF5
0	3	0	1	1	0	0

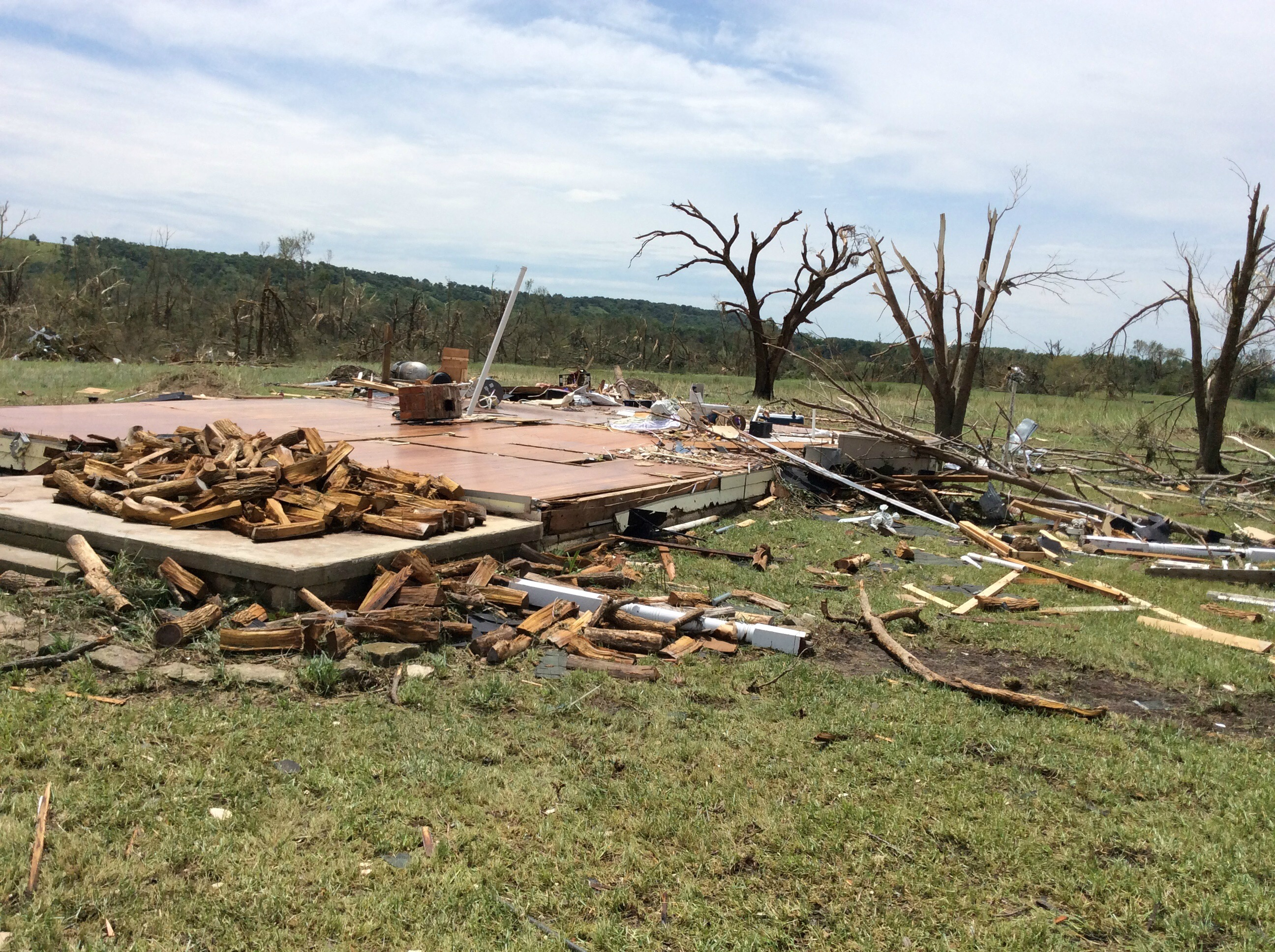
The poorly anchored home swept away at high-end EF3 intensity.

Five tornadoes touched down across parts of Kansas and Missouri on the evening of July 7, two of which were strong and caused significant damage in Greenwood County, Kansas. The first was a large and slow-moving EF3 wedge tornado that swept away a poorly anchored house, obliterated corn crop, and snapped and denuded numerous trees near the Otis Creek Reservoir. The second tornado, which was rated EF2, struck the town of Eureka, inflicting heavy damage to homes, trees, and a grain elevator in town, which also completely destroying mobile homes and outbuildings. No casualties occurred from the tornadoes.

=== July 11–14 (Europe) ===
FU	F0	F1	F2	F3	F4	F5
2	5	11	3	1	0	0

From July 11–14, a widespread outbreak of tornadoes affected various countries in Europe, including a few strong tornadoes. On July 11, an F1 tornado caused roof damage in the Magdagachi, Russia area, while another F1 tornado downed many trees and damaged some buildings in Bogaczewo and Kretowiny, Ostróda County, Warmian-Masurian Voivodeship, Poland. Two separate tornadoes, rated F0 and F1, also downed trees and tree limbs near Reka Lelyug and Namsk, in the rural Komi Republic of Russia. The strongest tornado to touch down in Russia that day was an F2 tornado that caused major roof damage to homes and downed many trees and power lines in and around the village of Zaozër'ye in Smolensk Oblast. Another F2 tornado moved through Sharkaŭshchyna in Belarus, heavily damaging homes and apartment buildings, destroying outbuildings, and snapping trees and power poles. In Sweden, an F0 tornado touched down briefly in Gribbylund, snapping small trees near a pond. Tornadoes continued to touch down the following day, including an F1 tornado that damaged a stable, some vehicles, and a farmhouse near Hijken, Netherlands. In Russia, an F0 tornado snapped tree limbs near Reka Porubok, while another brief F0 tornado occurred near Karacharovo. Two F1 tornadoes also downed many trees near Vichkino and Muralevo. In Dzyarzhynsk, Belarus, a rain wrapped F1 tornado caused considerable damage to roofs, trees, and fences, and speared a piece of roofing material through the windshield of a car. Another F1 tornado caused minor damage to homes in Stinatz, Austria and lofted a trampoline hundreds of yards into a forest.

A strong F2 tornado struck Kulyashouka, Belarus on July 13, where homes and apartment buildings had roofing torn off, many trees were snapped, and one apartment building sustained partial collapse of its top-floor exterior walls. Another tornado of unknown intensity snapped or uprooted hundreds of trees near Pryluki, Belarus as well. Later that evening, a destructive and long-tracked F3 tornado struck several villages in Moscow Oblast, travelling for 44 kilometres (27 mi), killing two people, injuring 29 others, and causing extensive damage along its path through the villages of Pershevo, Prudnya, and Kolyubakino. Numerous homes were severely damaged or destroyed along the path, including a few small homes that were ripped from their foundations. Greenhouses were destroyed, many trees were downed, and vehicles were damaged by the tornado as well. An F1 damaged roofs, trees, power lines, and cars in the Rostokino district of Moscow, and another F1 tornado injured six people in Amurskiy Poselok. A weak F0 tornado and an F1 tornado caused tree damage near Shishkino and Byli as well. A weak tornado also touched down briefly near Giengen an der Brenz, Germany. On July 14, an F0 tornado downed a tree near Nowe Grochale, Poland before the outbreak came to an end. Overall, 22 tornadoes occurred as a result of this outbreak, which produced two fatalities.

=== July 17 (United States) ===
EFU	EF0	EF1	EF2	EF3	EF4	EF5
0	5	3	2	0	0	0

A small outbreak of tornadoes impacted Iowa, Illinois, Texas, and New Mexico. The most significant damage occurred in Iowa, where multiple towns sustained direct hits from tornadoes. Numerous trees were snapped, and a co-op building was destroyed in the town of Andrew, Iowa as a result of an EF1 tornado. A destructive high-end EF2 tornado struck Vinton, causing major structural damage to homes and apartment buildings, snapping many trees and power poles, and severely damaging a ball field. Five people in Vinton were injured. Another EF2 tornado impacted the town of Walford, snapping trees, destroying one home and damaging the roofs of several others. No fatalities occurred as a result of the tornadoes.

=== July 25–26 (South Africa) ===
Several tornadoes were spotted on July 25–26 across Gauteng province in South Africa. The first was spotted in Randfontein on the West Rand of Johannesburg, where only minor damage was caused from trees being flattened, billboards pulled out of the ground and some roofs that were ripped off by strong winds. Another tornado swept through the East Rand in Tembisa and Kempton Park, northeast of O. R. Tambo International Airport. This tornado damaged the Tembisa Hospital as well as the Phumulani Mall in Tembisa. Approximately 20 people were injured and taken to nearby hospitals. No fatalities were reported.

== August ==
=== August 7 (Canada) ===
An extremely rare and weak EF0 tornado touched down in Grand Mira South, Nova Scotia, Canada. This was only the seventh confirmed tornado in Nova Scotia.

=== August 14 (Philippines) ===
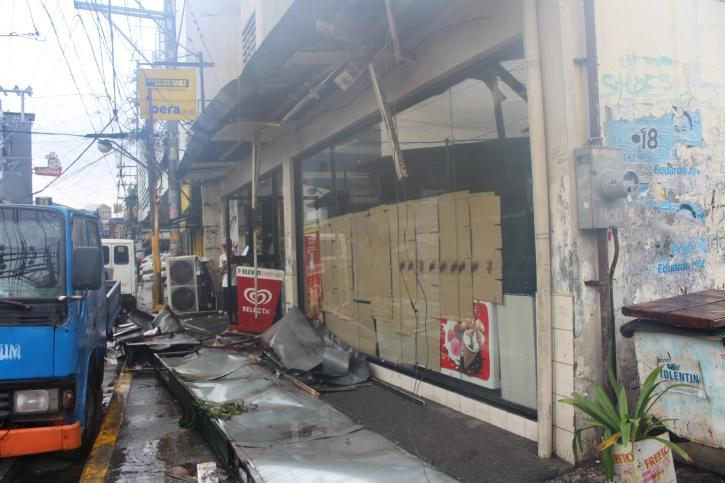
A damaged convenience store caused by an EF1 tornado in Sampaloc, Manila.

A rare multi-vortex EF1 tornado hit Metro Manila at around 16:35 PhST influenced by the southwest monsoon. It originated from a severe thunderstorm that was spotted over Manila Bay at 16:00 PhST moving northeast towards the metropolitan area. At 14:35 PhST, the tornado touched Baseco Compound and was seen travelling towards Intramuros and Sampaloc, before it dissipated in New Manila, Quezon City. It lasted for around 15 minutes where it damaged more than 100 buildings, including the National Press Club in Intramuros, and injured 2 people. It also toppled electrical poles and uprooted trees in the area. It became one of the most well-documented and well-known tornado in the country.

=== August 24 (United States and Canada) ===
EFU	EF0	EF1	EF2	EF3	EF4	EF5
0	12	6	4	2	0	0

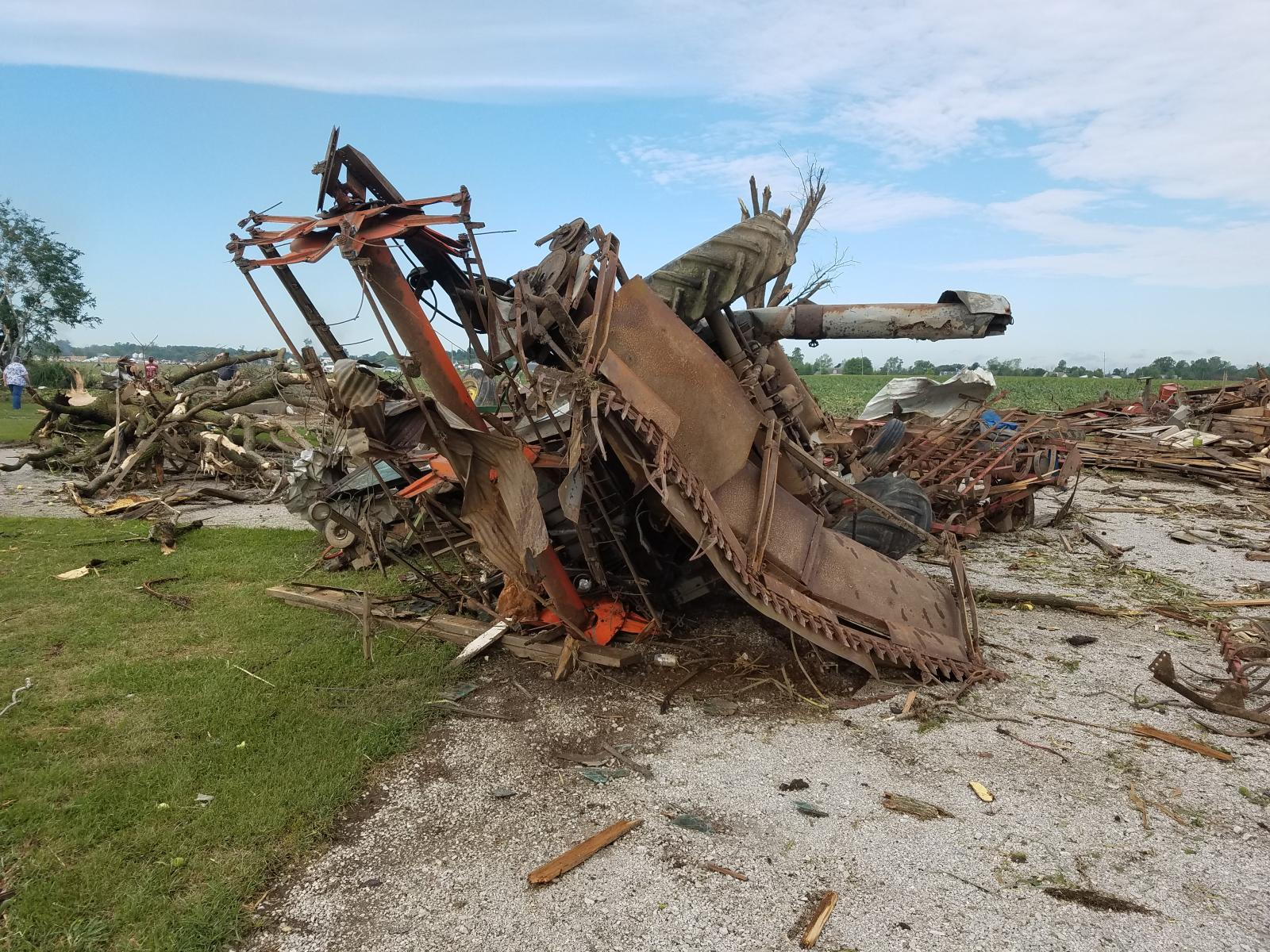
Farm machinery mangled beyond recognition by a high-end EF3 tornado near Woodburn, Indiana.

An unusual late-season outbreak of 24 tornadoes impacted Indiana, Ohio, and Ontario on the afternoon and evening of August 24, some of which were strong and damaging. This outbreak was largely unexpected, as the Storm Prediction Center only issued a slight risk that day, with the tornado threat limited to a 2% threat area across parts of Kansas, Iowa, Missouri, and Illinois. Despite this, numerous tornadoes touched down further to the east across parts of the Ohio Valley and Great Lakes, becoming the largest August tornado outbreak in both Indiana and Ohio. The first tornado of the event was an EF2 tornado that caused damage to 30 homes and several outbuildings near Linnsburg, Indiana. Later that day, an EF3 tornado struck the southern part of Kokomo, Indiana, damaging or destroying 1,000 homes, several apartment buildings, and a Starbucks, as well as downing many trees and power lines. A high-end EF3 tornado near Woodburn, Indiana swept away a poorly anchored house, obliterated well-built barns, scoured farm fields, debarked trees, and mangled several vehicles and pieces of farm machinery. A car was carried at least 585 yards (535 m) into a field by this tornado, and a combine was thrown 200 yards (180 m). As the tornado activity pushed into Ohio later that evening, significant tornadoes continued to touch down as a large, multiple-vortex EF2 tornado caused major damage to farmsteads near Cecil, Ohio, while another strong EF2 tornado caused severe damage to homes, barns, and a business near Defiance. Further to the north, a high-end EF2 tornado ripped through parts of Windsor, Ontario, severely damaging several factories and industrial buildings along the E.C. Row Expressway, one of which was completely leveled. Multiple vehicles were severely damaged, including several large cube vans that were dragged through a parking lot. Garbage dumpsters were thrown up to 120 yards (110 m) away, power poles were snapped, and large amounts of sheet metal was wrapped around guard rails and power lines. Trees were downed and homes sustained structural damage in residential areas as well. Another tornado developed over the Detroit River before moving ashore and striking Lasalle, Ontario at EF1 strength, causing roof, window, and siding damage to homes as well as downing many trees and damaging several boats. The outbreak produced numerous other weak tornadoes across the region before coming to an end. No fatalities occurred as a result of the outbreak.

=== August 27–28 (United States) ===
EFU	EF0	EF1	EF2	EF3	EF4	EF5
0	5	1	1	1	0	0

Scattered tornadoes occurred across the states of North Dakota, Minnesota, Iowa, and Michigan during a two-day period. Most of these tornadoes remained over open country, though a few caused damage. On August 27, a large EF1 tornado tossed small trailers, destroyed a small barn, and snapped and uprooted many trees near Emerado, North Dakota. An EF3 tornado near Hillsboro ripped the roof and exterior walls from a well-built house, severely damaged a grain elevator, and destroyed half of a metal building. The following night, a multiple-vortex EF2 tornado snapped numerous trees and power poles, completely destroyed a barn, and caused considerable roof and wall damage to two homes near Gary, Minnesota. Eight tornadoes were confirmed in total.

== September ==
=== September 9 (United States) ===
EFU	EF0	EF1	EF2	EF3	EF4	EF5
0	4	1	1	0	0	0

A strong EF2 tornado caused major damage at a farmstead near Sidney, Illinois, where a farmhouse was twisted off of its foundation and largely collapsed. Barns and garages were also destroyed, and headstones were damaged in a cemetery. A car and an RV camper sustained damage, and another home sustained roof damage. An EF1 tornado also overturned an RV camper, tore shingles from the roof of a house, and caused tree damage near Bismarck. A few other weak EF0 tornadoes touched down in other parts of Illinois, as well as in Minnesota and Texas.

=== September 22 (Utah) ===
EFU	EF0	EF1	EF2	EF3	EF4	EF5
0	0	2	0	0	0	0

Two rare tornadoes touched down in Utah this day. The first of which being a high end EF1 with 110 mph wind speeds (177 km/h) that touched down in southern Weber County in the city of Washington Terrace in the afternoon hours. The tornado would move northeast in northern Washington Terrace first causing minor damage to homes along W 4775 S. The tornado then intensified as it caused severe damage to 12 homes rendering them uninhabitable and injuring 5 people. The tornado then crossed into South Ogden, it started weakening as it caused minor damage to homes. The tornado then dissipated after being on the ground for 15 minutes causing $2,000,000 in damages. The second tornado would be an EF1 that would touch down in Garfield County near the city of Panguitch causing EF0 and EF1 damage along an intermittent path to homes in the city. The tornado would then cause more minor damage to trees before dissipating less than a minute after touchdown northeast of the city causing $300,000 in damages. Overall, 2 tornadoes and 5 injuries were confirmed.

=== September 28 (Australia) ===
FU	F0	F1	F2	F3	F4	F5
0	0	1	3	0	0	0

A severe thunderstorm event, which struck parts of the Australian state of South Australia, including the capital Adelaide, generated seven confirmed tornadoes with three rated as strong as F2, in what was the largest tornado outbreak ever recorded in the state. An F2 tornado filmed near Wilmington bent large electricity towers in half, contributing to a total statewide power outage, as well as destroying several farm sheds and outbuildings. Three other damaging tornadoes were officially analyzed by the Bureau of Meteorology in the Mid North region, with houses un-roofed, grain silos destroyed and large areas of trees uprooted. The storm outbreak also resulted in tennis-ball sized hail, damaging straight line winds and intense rainfall.

== October ==
=== October 3 (Dominican Republic) ===
On October 3, during Hurricane Matthew, a tornado formed over the community of Oviedo in the province of Pedernales. 12 homes were destroyed and a giant antenna was knocked down, although no deaths or injuries were reported.

=== October 6 (United States) ===
EFU	EF0	EF1	EF2	EF3	EF4	EF5
0	3	6	1	1	0	0

On October 6, the Storm Prediction Center issued an enhanced risk for severe thunderstorms in the Kansas area, including the risk of tornadoes. Several tornadoes touched down, including two unseasonably strong tornadoes to the east of Salina. The first of these two tornadoes were an EF2 tornado that snapped trees and completely destroyed a barn. The second was a large EF3 stovepipe tornado that obliterated a double-wide manufactured home, tossed farm equipment, snapped and denuded trees, and rolled a Jeep 200 yards (180 m). Further to the east, tornadoes also touched down in Illinois and Iowa. This included an EF1 tornado that tracked from Davenport to Cordova, damaging trees, vehicles, and homes along its path. A homeless shelter in downtown Davenport sustained damage from this tornado. A total of 11 tornadoes were confirmed.

=== October 12 (Indonesia) ===
A tornadic waterspout moved ashore and caused damage in Pangandaran, killing one person and damaging several houses.

=== October 14 (Oregon) ===
EFU	EF0	EF1	EF2	EF3	EF4	EF5
1	0	0	1	0	0	0

On October 14, an extratropical cyclone moved through the Pacific Northwest, causing a rare strong tornado in Oregon. The tornado began as a large waterspout before moving ashore. The tornado was assigned an EF2 rating in the town of Manzanita, where the tornado left behind torn off roofs, damaged homes, and destroyed businesses. Many trees and power lines were downed as well. A total of 129 homes and two businesses were impacted. No severe injuries were reported. A second weaker tornadic waterspout also struck Oceanside, but caused no noticeable damage and was rated EFU.

== November ==
=== November 6 (Italy) ===
FU	F0	F1	F2	F3	F4	F5
0	0	1	0	1	0	0

Along the west coast of central Italy, a supercell thunderstorm produced a strong tornadic waterspout which developed over the ocean and moved inland as it struck the town of Ladispoli, to the northwest of Rome. Structures had their roofs ripped off, vehicles were damaged, road signs were destroyed, and large trees were uprooted in town. Boats were damaged near the waterfront, and a crane collapsed. Multiple six to nine-story high rise apartment buildings sustained severe damage to balconies, windows, and walls, including one that sustained total collapse of a large portion of one of its exterior walls. One person was killed by falling masonry in this area. The tornado continued to the northeast and damaged a railway station before reaching rural areas near Ceri. Numerous trees were snapped and uprooted, while several cottages, restaurants, villas and farms sustained damage. Some of these structures sustained major damage to roofs and walls, and vineyards in the area suffered heavy damage. The tornado continued into the Ponton dell'Elce area, causing significant roof damage to homes and to a church. The tornado then reached its peak intensity as it struck Cesano, where structures sustained total roof and wall loss, vehicles were flipped, trees and signs were downed, and structures that remained standing were bombarded by projectiles. Another fatality occurred in this area as a man was killed in his vehicle by a falling tree. Numerous large trees were snapped and uprooted at Veio Regional Park before the tornado passed near Morlupo. Light poles, signs, and trees were downed in this area, roofs were blown off, and a van was rolled before the tornado dissipated. Two people were killed, and many others were injured by this tornado, which was rated F3. An F1 tornado that caused damage to farm buildings was confirmed near Saccheddu as well.

=== November 26 (Indonesia) ===
A damaging tornado touched down in Sidrap, Sulawesi killing one person and injuring two others. Twenty houses were damaged or destroyed, including six houses that were largely destroyed or flattened to the ground, seven houses with significant damage, and seven other houses that had minor damage.

=== November 27–30 (United States) ===
EFU	EF0	EF1	EF2	EF3	EF4	EF5
0	16	23	6	3	0	0

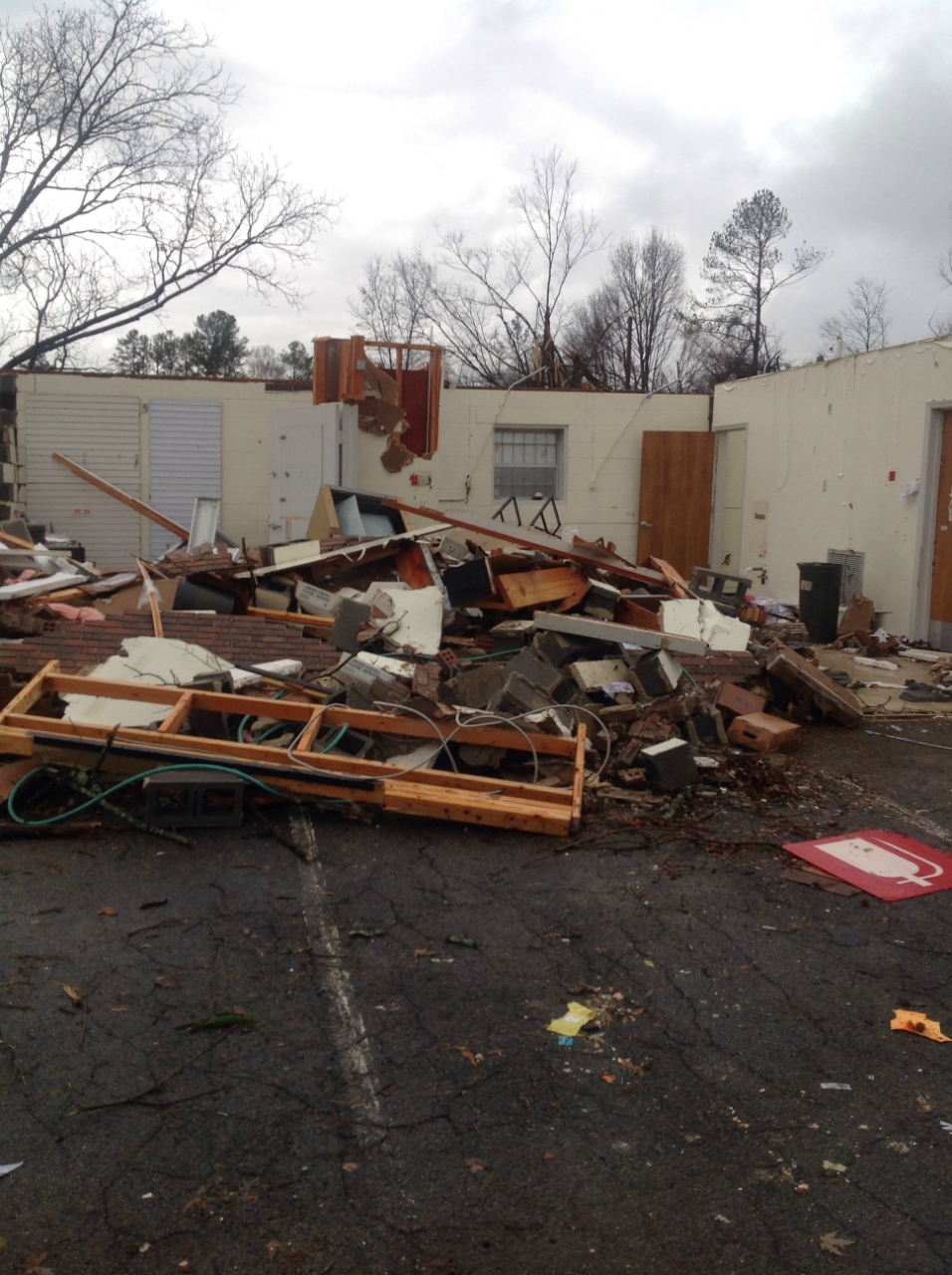
EF3 damage to a post office building in Ocoee, Tennessee.

On November 27, a storm system produced two EF0 tornadoes and an EF1 tornado in South Central Nebraska, causing minor damage. On November 28, the SPC issued an Enhanced risk of severe weather for Louisiana and Mississippi. Only one tornado touched down in the threat area, a brief EF0 tornado that remained over a rice field near Marksville, Louisiana. However, the surface low associated with system produced a few EF0 tornadoes in Iowa. Minor damage occurred in the towns of Radcliffe and Parkersburg, the latter of which was devastated by an EF5 tornado in May 2008.

The next day, the SPC issued a Moderate risk for central Mississippi and portions of Louisiana, Alabama, and Tennessee. This included a large 10% hatched risk area for tornadoes, and a smaller 15% hatched risk area for tornadoes across northern Mississippi. Throughout the late afternoon and evening, multiple supercell thunderstorms developed. Hail and winds battered Mississippi, and several EF1 tornadoes caused minor to moderate damage in rural areas of the state. After sunset, the event rapidly escalated into a significant outbreak as the intensifying supercell thunderstorms pushed into Alabama, and significant tornadoes began touching down. An EF2 tornado near Belgreen snapped many trees and injured one person when a house was damaged and shifted on its foundation. Two EF2 tornadoes moved through Winston County and heavily damaged or destroyed multiple homes, mobile homes, and outbuildings, and also snapped numerous trees and power poles near Arley and Double Springs. An EF2 tornado touched down over Monte Sano Mountain in eastern Huntsville, snapping and uprooting many trees, and damaging numerous homes as it passed through several subdivisions, a few of which had roofs torn off. A horse-riding arena was also destroyed by the Huntsville area tornado. An EF3 tornado passed near the towns of Danville and Neel, causing major structural damage to industrial buildings, homes and a fire station. A motorcycle shop was leveled, vehicles were tossed, and several mobile homes were completely destroyed as well. At around midnight and into the very early morning hours of November 30, the storms moved into northeastern Alabama and southern Tennessee. A powerful EF3 tornado ripped directly through the town of Rosalie and to the north of Ider, killing four people and injuring nine others. The Rosalie/Ider tornado destroyed homes and mobile homes, churches, and businesses along its path. A shopping plaza in Rosalie was leveled by the tornado, and a daycare center near Ider was reduced to a bare slab. Further to the north, strong tornadoes were impacting communities in Tennessee, including another EF3 tornado that severely damaged the town of Ocoee. The Ocoee post office and fire station were destroyed, two people were killed in town, a cell phone tower and a metal truss tower were knocked down, and 20 people were injured. A high-end EF2 tornado struck Athens, destroying several businesses and manufactured homes, heavily damaging a large church complex, and injuring 20 people. A few homes sustained major structural damage and a double-wide mobile home was completely destroyed by another high-end EF2 tornado that passed near Whitwell and Dunlap. After sunrise, additional weaker tornadoes touched down in Louisiana, Alabama, Georgia, Florida, and South Carolina. This included several brief tornadoes that caused minor to moderate damage in and around Atlanta. A high-end EF1 tornado downed many trees and damaged numerous homes in Simpsonville, South Carolina as well. Overall, the outbreak produced 48 tornadoes, killed six people, and injured many more.

== See also ==
- Weather of 2016
- Tornado
  - Tornadoes by year
  - Tornado records
  - Tornado climatology
  - Tornado myths
- List of tornado outbreaks
  - List of F5 and EF5 tornadoes
  - List of F4 and EF4 tornadoes
  - List of North American tornadoes and tornado outbreaks
  - List of 21st-century Canadian tornadoes and tornado outbreaks
  - List of European tornadoes and tornado outbreaks
  - List of tornadoes and tornado outbreaks in Asia
  - List of Southern Hemisphere tornadoes and tornado outbreaks
  - List of tornadoes striking downtown areas
  - List of tornadoes with confirmed satellite tornadoes
- Tornado intensity
  - Fujita scale
  - Enhanced Fujita scale
  - International Fujita scale
  - TORRO scale
