= National Emergency System =

Emergency response system in Uruguay

- Sistema Nacional de Emergencias
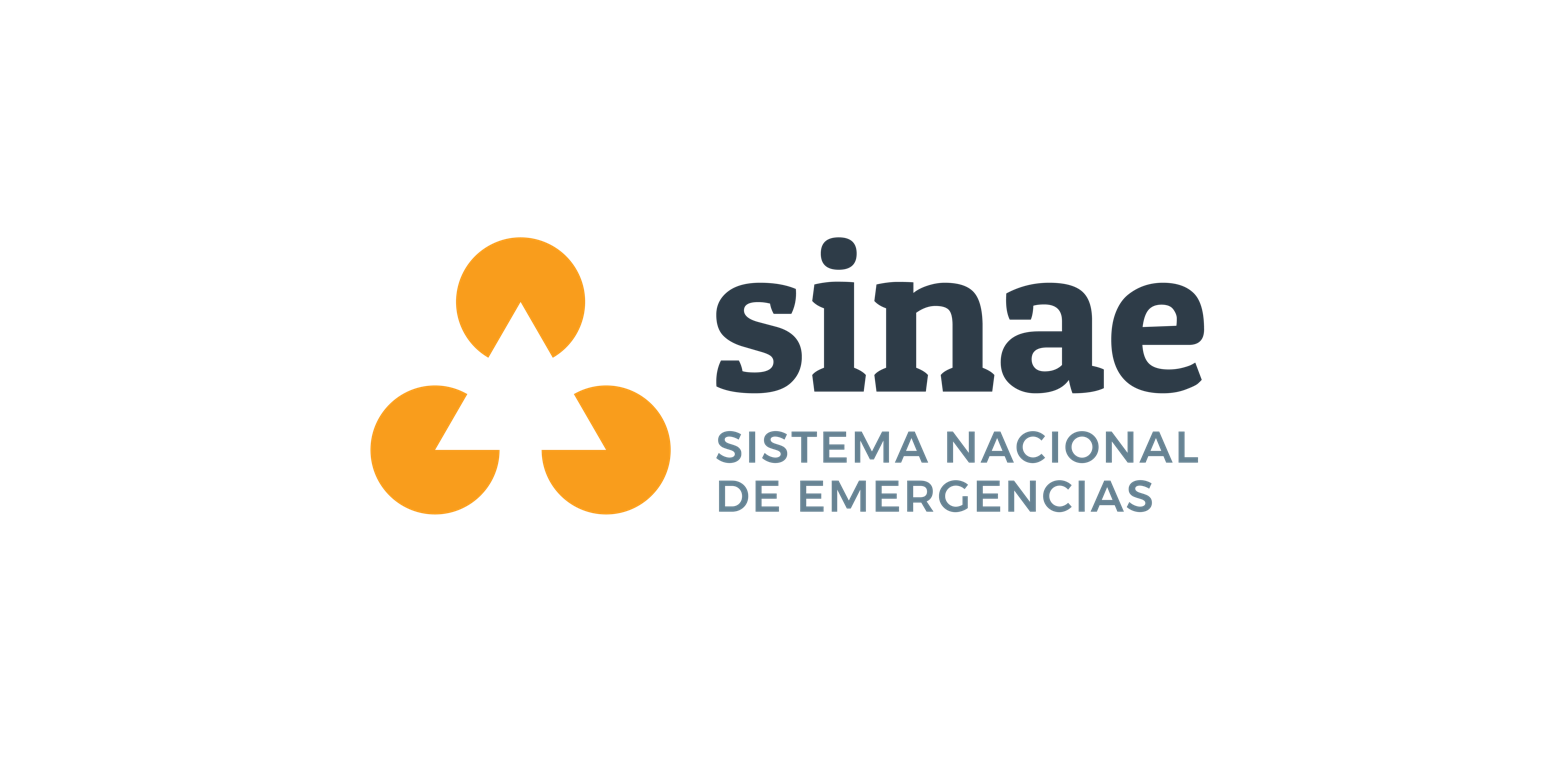
- Abbreviation: SINAE
- Formation: 25 October 2009
- Type: Government agency
- Headquarters: Executive Tower, Montevideo
- Region served: Uruguay
- Director: Sergio Rico
- Website: Sistema Nacional de Emergencias

The National Emergency System (SINAE) (Spanish: Sistema Nacional de Emergencias) is a public system of the Presidency of Uruguay, that is responsible for the protection of people, significant assets and the environment against the eventual or real occurrence of disaster situations, through the joint coordination of the State with the adequate use of available public and private resources, in order to promote the conditions for sustainable national development.

The operation of the National Emergency System is specified in the set of actions of the competent state bodies aimed at the prevention of risks linked to disasters of natural or human origin, foreseeable or unpredictable, periodic or sporadic; to the mitigation and attention of the phenomena that occur; and to the immediate rehabilitation and recovery tasks that may be necessary. It was created by Law No. 18,621 in October 2009. The current head is Sergio Rico, who has held the position since March 1, 2020.

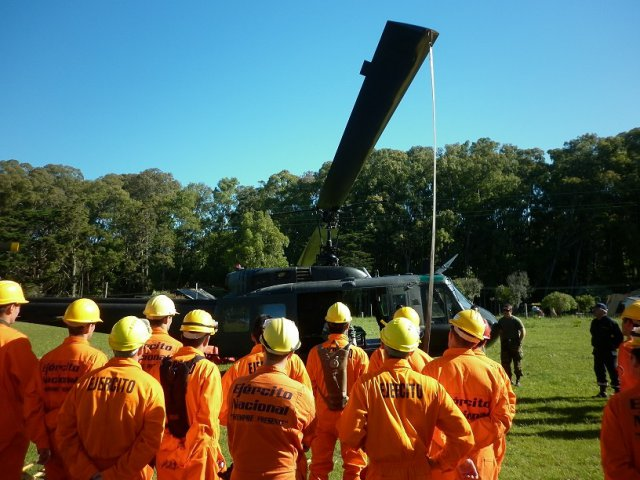
SINAE training on forest fires, addressed to the National Army and the National Fire Department (Santa Teresa National Park, Rocha).

== Functions ==
- Articulate the tasks and responsibilities of public entities and bodies, social institutions, and individuals in disaster prevention, mitigation, care, rehabilitation, and recovery.
- Integrate public and private efforts effectively and efficiently, according to the needs imposed by each of the System's activity phases.
- Guarantee a timely, effective and efficient management of all the human, technical, administrative and financial resources essential for the execution of the necessary actions.

== Integration ==
The National Emergency System is made up of:

- Executive power
- National Directorate of Emergencies.
- Ministries, autonomous entities and decentralized services.
- Departmental Emergency Committees (CDE).
- Coordinating Centers for Departmental Emergencies (CECOED).

== Operational activity ==
The state of disaster will be declared by the Executive Power, acting the President of the Republic in agreement with the competent ministers or in the Council of Ministers, immediately activating the National Emergency System. Declarations of disaster status enable the Executive Power to establish easements of passage and temporary occupations, as well as the temporary use of movable property necessary for the execution of the operational actions of the National Emergency System. The compulsory evacuation of people and animals in situations of vulnerability or risk may also be arranged. Public officials summoned to participate in activities of the National Emergency System in cases of alert or disaster status are obliged to assume them under the conditions determined by the National Emergency Directorate.
