= Nizhnyaya Verbovka =

Nizhnyaya Verbovka Нижняя Вербовка
- Khutor
- Location within Volgograd Oblast Location within Russia
- Coordinates: 48°26′N 42°10′E
- Country: Russia
- Region: Volgograd Oblast
- District: Chernyshkovsky District
- Time zone: UTC+4:00

Nizhnyaya Verbovka (Russian: Нижняя Вербовка) is a rural locality (a khutor) in Chernyshkovskoye Urban Settlement, Chernyshkovsky District, Volgograd Oblast, Russia. The population was 147 as of 2010. There are 3 streets.

== Geography ==
Nizhnyaya Verbovka is located 6 km northwest of Chernyshkovsky (the district's administrative centre) by road. Chernyshkovsky is the nearest rural locality.
