= Shishkino =

Shishkino Шишкино
- Village
- Location within Perm Krai Location within Russia
- Coordinates: 57°37′N 57°16′E
- Country: Russia
- Region: Perm Krai
- District: Beryozovsky District
- Time zone: UTC+5:00

Shishkino (Russian: Шишкино) is a rural locality (a village) in Beryozovskoye Rural Settlement, Beryozovsky District, Perm Krai, Russia. The population was 53 as of 2010.

== Geography ==
It is located on the Shakva River.
