= Voivodeship road =

Road type in Poland

Standard voivodeship roads plates

According to classes and categories of public roads in Poland, a voivodeship road (Polish: droga wojewódzka) is a category of roads one step below national roads in importance. The roads are numbered from 100 to 993. Total length of voivodeship roads in Poland is 28,536 km (17,730 mi) of which 61.4 km (38 mi) are unpaved (2008).

== List of voivodeship roads ==
Current list of voivodeship roads has been established with regulation of General Director of National Roads and Motorways from 2 December 2008 and modified with regulation from 11 December 2009.

=== 100–199 ===
DW 100	DK 93 (Świnoujście) – Świna River (ferry) – DK 3 (Świnoujście)
DW 100	Rumia – Pierwoszyno – Kosaków; annulled in 2023
DW 101	Pierwoszyno – Kosakowo; annulled in 2023
DW 102	Międzyzdroje – Dziwnówek – Pobierowo – Rewal – Trzebiatów – Kołobrzeg
DW 103	Kamień Pomorski – Trzebiatów
DW 104	DW 292 (Trzęsów) – DW 330 (Leszkowice); annulled in 2019
DW 105	Świerzno – Gryfice – Brojce – Rzesznikowo
DW 106	Rzewnowo – Golczewo – Nowogard – Maszewo – Łęczyca – Stargard Szczeciński – Pyrzyce
DW 107	Dziwnówek – Kamień Pomorski – Parłówko
DW 108	Parłówko – Golczewo – Płoty
DW 109	Mrzeżyno – Trzebiatów – Gryfice – Płoty
DW 110	Lędzin – Karnice – Cerkwica – Gryfice
DW 111	DK 3 (Recław) – Racimierz – Stepnica – Krępsko – Modrzewie – DK 3
DW 112	Expressway S6 ("Wicimice" junction) – S11 Expressway (Koszalin Zachód junction); old routing of DK 6
DW 112	Stepnica – Krępsko – Modrzewie; became a portion of DW 111 in 2015
DW 113	Glewice (Lotnisko Goleniów) – Żółwia Błoć – Maszewo
DW 114	Nowe Warpno – Trzebież – Police – Tanowo
DW 115	Szczecin – Tanowo – Dobieszczyn – German border
DW 116	DW 184 – Binino – Nojewo – DW 187 (Podpniewki)
DW 117	DW 180 – Średnica – DW 174 (Jędrzejewo); formerly DW 309
DW 117	Obrzycko – Pęckowo – Ostroróg; downgraded to a powiat road in 2015
DW 118	DW 117 – Zielonowo – Nowe Dwory; annulled (Note: Despite being abolished, route still appears in the GDDKiA order.)
DW 119	DK 10 (Szczecin) – Gorzów Wielkopolski
DW 119	Radziszewo – Chlebowo – Gardno
DW 120	German border – Gryfino – Stare Czarnowo – ... – Kołbacz – Kobylanka
DW 121	Pniewo – Banie
DW 122	Krajnik Dolny – Krzywin – Banie – Pyrzyce – Piasecznik
DW 123	DW 174 (Huta Szklana) – Kuźnica Żelichowska – DK 22 (Przysieki)
DW 124	German border – Cedynia – Chojna
DW 125	German border – Cedynia – Golice – Moryń – Wierzchlas
DW 126	Osinów Dolny – Siekierki – Mieszkowice – Smolnica – Dębno
DW 127	German border – Porzecze – Namyślin – Chwarszczany – Dębno
DW 128	Rów – Ławy; downgraded to powiat road 2161Z in 2015
DW 129	Sarbinowo – Dąbroszyn
DW 130	Barnówko – Tarnów – Baczyna
DW 131	Nowiny Wielkie – Krzeszyce
DW 132	DK 31 – Kostrzyn nad Odrą – Witnica – Gorzów Wielkopolski
DW 133	DW 181 (Chełst) – Borzysko Młyn – Sieraków – Ryżyn – DW 186 (Chrzypsko Wielkie)
DW 134	Muszkowo – Ośno Lubuskie – Rzepin – Urad – German border
DW 135	DW 181 (Wieleń) – Miały – Piłka – DW 133 (Borzysko Młyn)
DW 136	Wałdowice – Lubniewice – Wędrzyn
DW 137	Słubice – Sulęcin – Międzyrzecz – Trzciel
DW 138	Muszkowo – Długoszyn – ... – Sulęcin – Torzym – Gubin
DW 139	Górzyca – Kowalów – Rzepin – Debrznica
DW 140	DW 182 (Wronki) – Jasionna – Krucz – DW 181 (Ciszkowo)
DW 141	DW 142 (Przemocze) – DW 106 (Darż); no longer a voivodeship road due to creation of the S6 Expressway
DW 142	Szczecin (Note: The route actually ends near the non-existent village of Rzęśnica.) – Łęczyca – Lisowo
DW 143	Wartosław – Pierwoszewo – DW 182 (Stare Miasto)
DW 144	Nowogard – Dobra – Chociwel
DW 145	DW 150 (Chojno) – Warta River (ferry) – Pożarowo – Biezdrowo – DW 182
DW 146	DW 106 (Jenikowo)– DW 147 (Strzmiele); annulled in 2019
DW 147	Wierzbięcin – Troszczyno – Wołkowo – Łobez
DW 148	Starogard Łobeski – Łobez – Drawsko Pomorskie
DW 149	DW 150 (Jasionna) – DW 140 (Chojno-Błota); downgraded to a powiat road in 2017
DW 150	DW 182 (Smolnica) – Wronki – Chojno – DW 133 (Sieraków)
DW 151	Świdwin – Łobez – Węgorzyno – Recz – Barlinek – Gorzów Wielkopolski
DW 152	Płoty – Resko – Świdwin – Buślary
DW 153	DW 180 (Siedlisko) – Runowo – Gajewo – Ciszkowo – Goraj – DW 182 (Lubasz)
DW 154	DW 156 (Łęgowo) – Przynotecko – DW 158 (Trzebicz)
DW 155	DW 156 – Pławin; annulled in 2023
DW 156	Lipiany – Barlinek – DK 22 Strzelce Krajeńskie – ... – DK 22 (Strzelce Krajeńskie) – Zwierzyn – DW 160 (Klesno)
DW 157	Zwierzyn – Goszczanowo
DW 158	Gorzów Wielkopolski – Santok – DW 160 (Drezdenko)
DW 159	DW 158 (Nowe Polichno) – Skwierzyna – ... – Skwierzyna – DK 24 (Chełmsko)
DW 160	Suchań – Piasecznik – Choszczno – Drezdenko – Międzychód – Gorzyń – Lewice – DK 92 (Miedzichowo)
DW 161	DK 22 (Dobiegniew) – Podlesiec
DW 162	Rościęcino – Świdwin – Zarańsko
DW 163	Kołobrzeg – Białogard – Połczyn-Zdrój – Czaplinek – Wałcz
DW 164	Podlesiec – Zagórze – DW 160 (Drezdenko)
DW 165	DW 163 (Kołobrzeg) – Ustronie Morskie – Koszalin – Kłanino – DK 25 (Bobolice); former routing of DK 11
DW 165	Mielno – DK 11 (Mścice); annulled in 2020
DW 166	Białogard – DK 6 (now DW 112) at Żelimucha; annulled in 2020
DW 167	Koszalin – Tychowo – Ogartowo
DW 168	Mostowo – Drzewiany; annulled
DW 169	Byszyno – Tychowo – Głodowa
DW 170	Przeborowo – Drawiny – Nowe Bielice; annulled
DW 171	Bobolice – Barwice – Czaplinek
DW 172	Połczyn-Zdrój – Szczecinek
DW 173	Połczyn-Zdrój – DK 20 (Drawsko Pomorskie)
DW 174	Nowe Drezdenko – Kosin – Stare Bielice – Bielice Nowe (Note: Listed as Nowe Bielice in the GDDKiA order.) – Krzyż – Lubcz Mały – Wieleń Północny – Nowe Dwory – Gajewo – DW 178
DW 175	Drawsko Pomorskie – Kalisz Pomorski – Choszczno
DW 176	Niegosław – Karwin – Greater Poland Voivodeship border; annulled in 2025
DW 177	Czaplinek – Mirosławiec – Człopa – DW 181 (Wieleń)
DW 178	Wałcz – Trzcianka – Czarnków – DK 11 (Oborniki)
DW 179	Rusinowo – DW 188 (Piła)
DW 180	DW 177 (Kocień Wielki) – Trzcianka – Piła (Poznańska Avenue)
DW 181	Drezdenko – Wieleń – DW 182 (Czarnków)
DW 182	DW 160 (Międzychód) – Wronki – Piotrowo – Czarnków – DK 11 (Ujście)
DW 183	DW 182 (Sarbia) – DK 11 (Chodzież)
DW 184	DW 182 (Nowa Wieś) – Ostroróg – Szamotuły – DK 11 ("Poznań Napachanie" junction)
DW 185	DW 182 (Piotrowo) – Obrzycko – DW 184 (Szamotuły)
DW 186	DK 24 (Kwilcz) – Chrzypsko Wielkie – Wróblewo – DW 116
DW 187	DK 24 (Pniewy) – Szamotuły – Oborniki – DW 196 (Murowana Goślina)
DW 188	Człuchów – Debrzno – Złotów – DW 179 (Piła)
DW 189	DK 11 (Jastrowie) – Złotów – Więcbork
DW 190	DW 188 (Krajenka) – Szamocin – Margonin – Wągrowiec – DW 194 (Gniezno)
DW 191	DW 193 (Rataje) – Szamocin – DW 242
DW 192	Nowiny – Goraj
DW 193	DK 11 (Chodzież) – Margonin – DW 242 (Gołańcz)
DW 194	DK 92 (Poznań) – Pobiedziska – Gniezno – Modliszewko – DK 5 ("Mieleszyn" junction)
DW 195	DW 198 (Zatom Nowy) – Warta river – Zatom Stary – DW 182
DW 196	DK 2 ("Poznań Komorniki" junction) – Murowana Goślina – DW 241 (Wągrowiec)
DW 197	DW 196 (Sławica) – Rejowiec – Kiszkowo – DW 194 (Gniezno)
DW 198	DW 160 – Radgoszcz – Kaplin – Mokrzec – Zatom Nowy – Kobylarnia – DW 133 (Sieraków)
DW 199	Skwierzyna – Świniary – Wiejce – Mierzyn – DW 160 (Przedlesie)

=== 200–299 ===
DW 200	Rail station at Cierpice – DK 10
DW 201	Gwda Mała – Czarne – Barkowo
DW 202	Czarne – Rzeczenica
DW 203	Koszalin – Darłowo – Postomino – Ustka
DW 204	Rail station at Solec Kujawski – DW 249
DW 205	Darłówko – Darłowo – Krupy – Sławno – Polanów – Bobolice
DW 206	Koszalin – Polanów – Miastko
DW 207	DW 402 (Wielki Lubień) (Note: Listed as Lubień in the GDDKiA order.) – Dragacz – Michale – DK 16 (Grudziądz)
DW 208	Barcino – Wielin
DW 209	Warszkowo – Suchorze – Bytów
DW 210	Słupsk – Unichowo
DW 211	Nowa Dąbrowa – Czarna Dąbrówka – Puzdrowo – ... – Sierakowice – Kartuzy – Żukowo
DW 212	Osowo Lęborskie – Bytów – Chojnice – Zamarte
DW 213	Słupsk – Wicko – Żelazna – Sulicice – Celbowo
DW 214	Łeba – Lębork – Sierakowice – Puzdrowo – Kościerzyna – Warlubie
DW 215	Władysławowo – Sulicice
DW 216	Reda – Władysławowo – Hel
DW 217	Rail station at Warlubie – DK 91
DW 218	Gdańsk – Chwaszczyno, second section: DW 224 – Wejherowo – Krokowa
DW 219	Rail station at Brody – DW 234
DW 220	Rail station at Morzeszczyn – DW 234
DW 221	Gdańsk – Przywidz – Kościerzyna
DW 222	Gdańsk – Godziszewo – Starogard Gdański – Skórcz
DW 223	DW 238 (Bydgoszcz) – DK 5 ("Błonie" junction)
DW 224	Sopieszyno – Łebno – Przodkowo – Kartuzy – Nowa Karczma – Skarszewy – Godziszewo – Tczew
DW 225	Rail station at Pelplin – DW 229
DW 226	Nowa Karczma – Mierzeszyn – Pruszcz Gdański – Przejazdowo
DW 227	Pruszcz Gdański – Trutnowy – Wocławy
DW 228	Bytów – Klukowa Huta – Kartuzy
DW 229	Jabłowo – Pelplin – Rudno – Wielkie Walichnowy
DW 230	Wielgłowy – Brzuśce – Pelplin – Cierzpice
DW 231	Skórcz – Kolonia Ostrowicka
DW 232	DK 80 (Bydgoszcz) – Bydgoszcz (Wojska Polskiego Street)
DW 233	Trzepowo – Borowina – Mierzeszyn
DW 234	Skórcz – Morzeszczyn – Gniew
DW 235	Korne – Chojnice
DW 236	Konarzyny – Swornegacie – Brusy
DW 237	Czersk – Tuchola – Gostycyn – Mąkowarsko
DW 238	DK 5 ("Bydgoszcz Opławiec" junction) – DK 239 (Bydgoszcz); former routing of DK 25
DW 239	DK 5 ("Bydgoszcz Północ" junction) – Bydgoszcz – DK 10 ("Bydgoszcz Południe" junction)
DW 239	Błądzim – Lniano – Drzycim – Świecie; one section downgraded to a powiat road and the other section absorbed into DW 272
DW 240	Chojnice – Tuchola – Świecie
DW 241	Tuchola – Sępólno Krajeńskie – Więcbork – Nakło nad Notecią – Wągrowiec – Rogoźno
DW 242	Więcbork – Łobżenica – Falmierowo
DW 243	Mrocza – DK 25 (Koronowo)
DW 244	Kamieniec – Wojnowo – Gogolinek – Bożenkowo – Strzelce Dolne
DW 245	DK 5 (Gruczno) – Głogówko Królewskie – DK 91 (Chełmno)
DW 246	Paterek – Samoklęski Małe – Szubin – Łabiszyn – Złotniki Kujawskie – Gniewkowo – Dąbrowa Biskupia
DW 247	Kcynia – Szubin
DW 248	Zbrachlin – Topolno – Borówno
DW 249	DK 80 (Czarnowo) – Vistula River – Solec Kujawski – DK 10
DW 250	Suchatówka – Służewo
DW 251	Kaliska – Damasławek – Żnin – Barcin – Pakość – Inowrocław – DK 25 (Sławęcinek)
DW 252	DK 15 (Jacewo) – Zakrzewo – Włocławek
DW 253	Łabiszyn – Murczyn
DW 254	Brzoza – Łabiszyn – Barcin – Mogilno – Wylatowo
DW 255	Pakość – Broniewice – Strzelno
DW 256	DK 5 (Trzeciewiec) – Włóki – Bydgoszcz
DW 257	DW 273 (Mała Nieszawka) – Vistula River – Toruń DK 80
DW 258	DK 1 – Vistula River – Silno – Osiek – Obrowo
DW 259	Rail station at Smętowo – DW 231
DW 260	Gniezno – Witkowo – Wólka
DW 261	Rail station at Gniew – DK 91
DW 262	Kwieciszewo – Gębice – Orchowo – Szyszłowo
DW 263	Słupca – Ślesin – Sompolno – Kłodawa – Dąbie
DW 264	Kleczew – Konin
DW 265	Brześć Kujawski – Kowal – Gostynin
DW 266	Ciechocinek – Służewo – Radziejów – Sompolno – Konin
DW 267	Ujma Duża – Osięciny – Piotrków Kujawski
DW 268	Brzezie – Wieniec – Brześć Kujawski
DW 269	Szczerkowo – Izbica Kujawska – Chodecz – Choceń – Kowal
DW 270	Brześć Kujawski – Lubraniec -Izbica Kujawska – Brdów – Koło
DW 271	Rail station at Opalenie – DK 90
DW 272	DK 5 ("Świecie Północ" junction) – Sulnowo – Laskowice – Lipienki – Jeżewo – Grupa – Dolna Grupa
DW 273	DK 10 Cierpice – Mała Nieszawka – DW 257
DW 274	Rail station at Emilianowo – DK 10
DW 275	Rail station at Inowrocław – DW 251
DW 276	Krosno Odrzańskie – Świebodzin
DW 277	Skąpe – Sulechów
DW 278	Szklarka Radnicka – Nietkowice – Sulechów – Sława – Wschowa
DW 279	Zawada – Racula – Budachów – Leśniów Wielki – Wysokie
DW 280	Zielona Góra – Czerwieńsk – Brody
DW 281	Zielona Góra – Wysokie – Pomorsko
DW 282	DK 27 – Zielona Góra – Zabór – Bojadła
DW 283	DW 282 (Zielona Góra) – Zatonie – Kożuchów – Lasocin – Rejów
DW 284	Rail station at Złotniki Kujawskie – DK 25
DW 285	Gubin – Grabice – Starosiedle
DW 286	Gubin – Biecz
DW 287	Kosierz – Bobrowice – Lubsko – Żary; section from DK 32 to Bobrowice became a powiat road in 2008
DW 288	Dąbie – Lubiatów – Bogaczów – Nowogród Bobrzański
DW 289	Border crossing – Zasieki – Lubsko – Nowogród Bobrzański
DW 290	Niwiska – Mirocin Dolny
DW 291	Rail station at Otłoczyn – DK 91 (Note: Still listed as DK 1 in the GDDKiA order.)
DW 292	DW 315 (Nowa Sól) – Bytom Odrzański – Głogów DK 12 – ... – DK 12 – Studzionki – Nieszczyce – Chobienia – Ścinawa – DK 36 – ... – DK 36 – Zaborów – Lisowice
DW 293	DW 328 (Nowe Miasteczko) – Bytom Odrzański
DW 294	Trzebiel – Tuplice – Jasień
DW 295	Nowogród Bobrzański – Żagań
DW 296	Kożuchów – Żagań – Iłowa – Ruszów – Godzieszów – DK 30 (Lubań)
DW 297	Nowa Sól – Kożuchów – Szprotawa – DK 12 – ... – DK 12 – Bolesławiec – DK 94 – ... – DK 94 – Lwówek Śląski – DK 30 (Pasiecznik)
DW 298	Kłobuczyn – Nielub; annulled in 2015
DW 299	Rail station at Gniewkowo – DK 15

=== 300–399 ===
DW 300	Iłowa – Gozdnica
DW 301	DK 91 (Janowice) (Note: Listed as Janowiska in the GDDKiA order.) – Tadzin – Bądkowo – Krotoszyn – Osięciny
DW 302	DW 303 (Babimost) – Zbąszyń – DW 305 (Glinno)
DW 303	Świebodzin – Babimost – Siedlec – DK 32 (Powodowo)
DW 304	DK 32 (Okunin) – Nowe Kramsko – DW 303 (Babimost)
DW 305	DK 92 (Bolewice) – Nowy Tomyśl – Wolsztyn – Wschowa – Wroniniec
DW 306	DW 187 (Lipnica) – Duszniki – Buk – Stęszew – DW 431 (Nowe Dymaczewo)
DW 307	DW 433 (Poznań) – Buk – Opalenica – DW 308 (Bukowiec)
DW 308	DW 305 (Nowy Tomyśl) – Grodzisk Wielkopolski – ... – Grodzisk Wielkopolski – DK 5 (Kościan Północ junction) – Kunowo
DW 309	DK 36 – Kaczkowo – DK 5 ("Śmigiel Południe" junction)
DW 309	DW 180 – Średnica – Jędrzejewo; became a portion of DW 117 in 2017
DW 310	DK 5 ("Czempiń" junction) – Czempiń – Śrem
DW 311	DK 5 ("Czempiń" junction) – Stęszew – DK 2 ("Poznań Komorniki" junction)
DW 311	Kawczyn – Czempiń; downgraded to a powiat road
DW 312	DK 32 (Rakoniewice) – DK 5 ("Śmigiel Północ" junction)
DW 313	DW 303 (Babimost) – Kargowa – Klenica
DW 314	Kargowa – DW 315 (Świętno)
DW 315	DK 32 (Wolsztyn) – Konotop – Nowa Sól
DW 316	Sławocin – Ciosaniec – Kaszczor; annulled
DW 317	DK 62 (Wloclawek) – DW 265 (Kruszyn)
DW 317	Border crossing – DK 30 (Zgorzelec); downgraded to a gmina road
DW 318	Lubięcin – Sława
DW 319	Stare Strącze – Krzepielów – DK 12 (Serby)
DW 320	DK 4 (Legnica Wschód junction) – Nowa Wieś Legnicka – Jawor – Sokola – DK 5 (Bolków) – ... – DK 5 (Bolków) – Marciszów Górny – Kamienna Góra – Lubawka – Czech border
DW 320	DK 94 – Maślice – Rędzin – DW 342; annulled in 2019
DW 321	DW 315 (Przyborów) – Siedlisko – ... – Różanówka – Kierzno – DW 319 (Grodziec Mały)
DW 322	DW 320 – rail station at Wrocław Osobowice; annulled in 2019
DW 323	DK 12 (Leszno) – Góra – Studzionki – Rudna – Rynarcice – DK 3 (Lubin)
DW 324	Szlichtyngowa – [Wroniniec] – Góra – DK 36
DW 325	Tarnów Jezierny – Siedlisko – Bytom Odrzański – Dębianka – Różanówka
DW 326	DW 292 – Oder River – DW 325; annulled
DW 327	DW 320 (Bolków) – DK 5 (Wierchoslawice)
DW 327	Rail station at Wrocław Różanka – Rail station at Wrocław Osobowice; downgraded to a gmina road in 2020
DW 328	DW 333 (Nowe Miasteczko) – Przemków – DK 12 – ... – DK 12 – Chocianów – Chojnów – DK 94 – ... – DK 94 – Złotoryja – Jerzmanice-Zdrój – Świerzawa – Wojcieszów – Kaczorów – DK 3 – ... – DK 3 – Marciszów
DW 330	Krzepowo – Luboszyce; annulled in 2019
DW 331	Chocianów – Polkowice – Tarnówek – Rynarcice
DW 332	German border (Sieniawka) – Czech border (Kopaczów)
DW 332	Tarnówek – Rudna; became portions of DW 331 and DW 323 in 2010
DW 333	DW 292 (Nowa Sól) – Nowe Miasteczko – Kłobuczyn – Potoczek – Lubin – DK 36 – ... – DK 36 – DK 3 ("Głogów Południe" junction) – ... – DK 3 (węzeł Lubin Południe) – Chróstnik – Rzeszotary – DK 94 (Legnica) – ... – DK 3 ("Legnica Zachód" junction) – Legnica – DK 4 ("Legnica Wschód" junction); former portion of DK 3
DW 333	Ciechanów – Lubów – Chobienia; became a portion of DW 334
DW 334	Ciechanów – Chobienia – Jemielno – Krzelów – Moczydlnica Dworska – DW 338 (Bożeń)
DW 335	Chojnów – DK 3 ("Lubin Zachód" junction)
DW 336	Brzezinka Średzka – Maślice; downgraded to a gmina road
DW 337	DK 3 (Note: From 2025, DK 5 runs through Jelenia Góra, not DK 3.) (Jelenia Góra, Grabary) – DK 3 (Jelenia Góra, Maciejowa)
DW 337	Rail station at Wrocław Pracze – DW 336; downgraded to a gmina road
DW 338	Wińsko – Bożeń – Wołów – Lubiąż – DK 94 (Kawice)
DW 339	DK 5 ("Żmigród" junction) – Strupina – Wołów
DW 340	DK 36 (Ścinawa) – Wołów – DK 5 ("Trzebnica" junction) – ... – Trzebnica – Dobroszyce – Oleśnica
DW 341	DW 340 (Radecz) - Brzeg Dolny - Miękinia - DK 94 (Błonie)
DW 341	Prawików – Brzeg Dolny – Pęgów; annulled
DW 342	DK 5 (Wrocław) – Pęgów – Oborniki Śląskie
DW 343	DW 342 – Rail station at Oborniki Śląskie – DW 342
DW 343	DK 5 (Strzegom) – DW 340 (Wołów); annulled
DW 344	DW 348 (Biskupice Podgórne, Koreńska Street) – DK 35 ; annulled in 2012
DW 344	Rail station at Pęgów – DW 342
DW 345	DK 94 (Wilczków) – Budziszów Wielki – DK 5 (Strzegom)
DW 346	Środa Śląska – Kąty Wrocławskie – Gniechowice – Wierzbice – DK 8 – ... – DK 8 – Gaj Oławski – Godzikowice
DW 347	Wrocław – Pietrzykowice – Kąty Wrocławskie
DW 348	Małuszów – A4 ("Pietrzykowice" junction); downgraded to a powiat road in 2022
DW 349	DK 94 – rail station at Wrocław Kuźniki; downgraded to a gmina road
DW 350	Łęknica – Przewóz – Gozdnica – Ruszów – Bolesławiec
DW 351	DW 296 (Jagodzin) – Pieńsk – Jędrzychowice – Zgorzelec – DK 94 (Jędrzychowice)
DW 352	Zgorzelec – Bogatynia – DW 332 (Sieniawka)
DW 353	Pieńsk – Strzelno
DW 354	Zatonie – Sieniawka – German border
DW 355	DW 352 (Koźmin) – Zawidów – Czech border
DW 356	DK 94/A8 – rail station at Wrocław Żerniki; lost provincial road status in 2019
DW 357	German border – Radomierzyce – Kolonia Osiek Łużycki – Sulików – Lubań – Nowogrodziec – Zebrzydowa – Osiecznica
DW 358	Włosień – Leśna – Pobiedna – Czerniawa-Zdrój – Orłowice – Świeradów-Zdrój – Szklarska Poręba
DW 359	DK 5 ("Żmigródek" junction) – Żmigród – Prusice – DK 15 (Nowy Dwór) – ... – Trzebnica – Wisznia Mała – Psary – DK 5 ("Wrocław Północ" junction)
DW 359	Rail station at Wrocław Leśnica – DK 94; downgraded to a gmina road in 2019
DW 360	Gryfów Śląski – Giebułtów – Świecie – Border crossing
DW 361	DK 30 (Krzewie Wielkie) – Mirsk – Orłowice – Czerniawa-Zdrój – Czech border
DW 362	Kąty Wrocławskie-Wrocław; section in Wrocław downgraded to a gmina road, remainder annulled
DW 363	DK 3 (Bolków) – DW 320 (Bolków)
DW 364	Gryfów Śląski – Lwówek Śląski – Złotoryja – Legnica
DW 365	DK 3 (Jelenia Góra) – Stara Kraśnica – Piotrowice – DW 363 (Piotrowice Osiedle)
DW 366	Piechowice – Stara Kraśnica – Piotrowice – Kowary; lost provincial road status in 2023
DW 367	DK 3 (Jelenia Góra) – Kowary – Przełęcz Kowarska – Kamienna Góra – DK 5 (Note: According to Order No. 6 of GDDKiA of 2 April 2026, this is DW 320.) – ... – DK 5 – Czarny Bór – Boguszów-Gorce – Wałbrzych
DW 368	DW 372 (Mirków) – Długołęka – Smardzów – DK 8 (Oleśnica Zachód junction), former routing of DK 8; downgraded to a powiat road in 2022 due to creation of DW 372
DW 369	Przełęcz Kowarska – Lubawka
DW 370	Ogrzelec – Czech border; former portion of DW 368
DW 370	Smolec – Mokronos Dolny; lost provincial road status in 2019
DW 371	Czech border – DW 389 (Mostowice)
DW 371	(City/town limits at Świebodzice); lost provincial road status in 2015
DW 372	Wroclaw Eastern Bypass: DK 8 ("Wrocław Psie Pole" junction) – Mirków – Łany – Siechnice – Iwiny – Radomierzyce; portion of route formerly DK 98
DW 372	Ścinawa – Zaborów – Prochowice; became a portion of DW 292 in 2010
DW 373	DK 8 ("Oleśnica Północ" junction) – Spalice
DW 373	(City/town limits at Świebodzice); lost provincial road status in 2015
DW 374	DW 382 (Stanowice) – Świebodzice
DW 375	DK 5 (Dobromierz) – Stare Bogaczowice – Struga – DW 376 (Szczawno-Zdrój)
DW 376	DK 35 (Szczawno-Zdrój) – Lubomin – DW 367 (Jabłów)
DW 377	Nowe – Twarda Góra – Pieniążkowo
DW 378	DK 39 (Biedrzychów) – Łojowice – DW 401 (Grodków)
DW 379	Wałbrzych – Stary Julianów – Modliszów – Świdnica
DW 380	DK 35 (Wałbrzych) – DW 381 (Wałbrzych)
DW 380	Unisław Śląski – Głuszyca; lost provincial road status in 2019
DW 381	Wałbrzych – Jedlina-Zdrój – Głuszyca – Nowa Ruda – Święcko – Kłodzko
DW 382	DW 297 (Bolesławiec) – Warta Bolesławiecka – Zagrodno – Nowa Wieś Złotoryjska – Złotoryja – Jawor – DK 3 ("Jawor Wschód" junction) – Strzegom – Słotwina – DK 35 – ... – DK 35 – Świdnica – Dzierżoniów – Ząbkowice Śląskie – DK 8 – ... – DK 8 – Paczków – DK 46 – ... – DK 46 – Czech border
DW 383	Jedlina-Zdrój – Walim – Pieszyce – Dzierżoniów
DW 384	Nowa Ruda – Wolibórz – Bielawa – Łagiewniki
DW 385	Wolibórz – Srebrna Góra – Ząbkowice Śląskie – DK 8 – ... – DK 8 – Ziębice – Grodków – Kopice – DK 46 (Jaczowice)
DW 386	Border crossing – Tłumaczów – Ścinawka Górna – Ścinawka Średnia – Ścinawka Dolna – DW 381 (Gorzuchów)
DW 387	Ścinawka Górna – Kudowa-Zdrój
DW 388	Ratno Dolne – Polanica-Zdrój – Bystrzyca Kłodzka
DW 389	DK 8 (Zielone Ludowe) – Duszniki-Zdrój – Zieleniec – Mostowice – DK 33 (Międzylesie)
DW 390	Kamieniec Ząbkowicki – Płonica – Złoty Stok – DK 46 – ... – DK 46 – Lądek-Zdrój
DW 391	Warlubie – Rulewo – Rozgarty – DW 272
DW 392	Żelazno – Lądek-Zdrój – Stronie Śląskie – Bystrzyca Kłodzka
DW 393	Lubań – Kościelniki Średnie – Leśna
DW 394	Przyłubie – Solec Kujawski – DW 397
DW 395	DW 372 (Żerniki Wrocławskie) – DW 396 (Strzelin)
DW 396	DK 8 ("Oleśnica Północ" junction) – Spalice – Oleśnica – Bierutów – Oława – DK 94 – ... – DK 94 – Gaj Oławski – Strzelin – Henryków – Ziębice – Ząbkowice Śląskie
DW 397	DW 394 – DK 10
DW 398	Złotniki Kujawskie – Niszczewice – Liszkowo
DW 399	Liszkowo – Żelechlin

=== 400–499 ===
DW 400	Więcławice – Latkowo
DW 401	DK 94 (Żłobizna) – Grodków – Skoroszyce – DK 46 (Pakosławice)
DW 402	DK 91 (Fletnowo) – Wielki Lubień – Vistula river – DK 16 (Grudziądz)
DW 403	DK 39 (Łukowice Brzeskie) – DW 401
DW 404	Szewce – Szewce railway station; lost voivodeship road status in 2018
DW 405	Niemodlin – Tułowice – Korfantów
DW 406	Nysa – Jasienica Dolna – DW 405 (Włostowa)
DW 407	Nysa – Korfantów – Łącznik – DW 414
DW 408	Kędzierzyn Koźle – Gliwice
DW 409	Dębina – Krapkowice – Strzelce Opolskie
DW 410	Kędzierzyn Koźle – Kobylice – Biadachów – Oder River – DW 408 (Brzeźce)
DW 411	Nysa – DK 40 (Głuchołazy)
DW 412	Tupadły – Kobylniki
DW 413	Ligota Prószkowska – DW 429
DW 414	DK 94 (Wrzoski) – Opole – Prószków – Biała – Prudnik (DK 40)
DW 415	DK 45 (Zimnice) – Rogów Opolski – DW 409 (Krapkowice)
DW 416	DK 45 (Żywocice) – Głogówek – Głubczyce – Kietrz – Racibórz
DW 417	DK 40 (Laskowice) – Klisino – Szonów – Szczyty – Racibórz
DW 418	DK 45 (Reńska Wieś) – Kędzierzyn Koźle
DW 419	Nowa Cerekwia – Niekazanice – Branice – Border crossing
DW 420	Kietrz – Dzierżysław – Pilszcz – Border crossing
DW 421	Szczyty – Błażejowice – Nędza
DW 422	DW 421 (Łany) – Dzielnica – Przewóz – Oder River – Dziergowice
DW 423	Opole – Krapkowice – Zdzieszowice – Kędzierzyn Koźle
DW 424	Gwoździce – Oder River – Odrowąż – DW 409 (Gogolin)
DW 425	Bierawa – Kuźnia Raciborska – Rudy
DW 426	Zawadzkie – DK 94 (Strzelce Opolskie) – ... – DK 94 (Strzelce Opolskie) – Olszowa – Kędzierzyn-Koźle
DW 427	DK 45 – Zakrzów – Kochaniec – Roszowice – Dzielnica
DW 428	annulled
DW 429	Wawelno – Komprachcice – Prószków – DK 45
DW 430	DW 196 (Poznań) – DW 431 (Mosina)
DW 431	DW 306 (Nowe Dymaczewo) – Mosina – DW 434 (Kórnik)
DW 432	DK 12 (Leszno) – Krzywiń – Śrem – Środa Wielkopolska – DK 15
DW 433	DK 2 (Poznań, "Poznań Krzesiny" junction) – Poznań (Obornicka Street – city limits)
DW 433	Swarzędz – Gądki; downgraded to powiat road 2489P in 2016
DW 434	DK 5 ("Kleszczewo" junction) – Kórnik – Śrem – Kunowo – Gostyń – DK 36
DW 435	DK 94 (Opole) – Opole – DK 45 (Opole) – ... – Wawelno – Niemodlin – DK 46
DW 436	DW 434 (Pysząca) – Książ Wielkopolski – DK 11 (Nowe Miasto nad Wartą)
DW 437	DW 434 (Dolsk) – Koszkowo – DK 12
DW 438	Borek Wielkopolski – DK 15 (Koźmin Wielkopolski)
DW 439	DW 359 (Żmigród) – Żmigród – Sułów – Milicz – ... – Twardogóra – Syców – Nowy Dwór – DK 8 ("Syców Zachód" junction)
DW 440	Borowa Oleśnicka railway station – old route of DK 8; lost voivodeship road status in 2019
DW 441	DK 15 (Miłosław) – DW 442 (Borzykowo)
DW 442	DK 15 (Września) – Pyzdry – Gizałki – DK 12 (Kalisz)
DW 443	DK 11 (Jarocin) – Gizałki – Rychwał – DK 72 (Tuliszków)
DW 444	DK 36 (Krotoszyn) – Odolanów – DK 11 (Ostrzeszów)
DW 445	DW 444 (Odolanów) – Ostrów Wielkopolski
DW 446	Długołęka railway station – Wrocławska Street, Długołęka; lost voivodeship road status in 2019
DW 447	DK 11 (Antonin) – DW 449 (Grabów nad Prosną)
DW 448	Milicz – Syców; became a portion of DW 439 in 2020
DW 449	DK 8 ("Syców Wschód") – Syców – Ostrzeszów – Błaszki
DW 450	Kalisz – Grabów nad Prosną – Wyszanów – Wieruszów
DW 451	DW 396 (Bierutów) – Namysłów
DW 452	Wrocław Psie Pole railway station – DK 98; lost voivodeship road status in 2018
DW 453	Sołtysowice railway station – DK 5; lost voivodeship road status in 2019
DW 454	Opole – Pokój – Namysłów
DW 455	Wrocław (Plac Grunwaldzki) – DW 372 (Wrocław Wojnów) – Łany – Kamieniec Wrocławski – Czernica – Jelcz – Oława
DW 456	DW 304 – Zielona Góra Airport
DW 457	DK 39 (Pisarzowice) – Popielów – Dobrzeń Wielki
DW 458	Obórki – Lewin Brzeski – Skorogoszcz – Popielów
DW 459	Opole – Narok – Skorogoszcz
DW 460	Kościerzyce – Oder River – Pawłów – Kopanie – DW 462
DW 461	Kup – Jełowa
DW 462	Stobrawa – Oder River – Kopanie – Łosiów – Krzyżowice
DW 463	Bierdzany – Ozimek – Zawadzkie
DW 464	Narok – Oder River – Chróścice
DW 465	Żelazna – Oder River – Dobrzeń Mały
DW 466	DK 92 (Słupca) – Ciążeń – DW 442 (Pyzdry)
DW 467	DW 466 (Ciążeń) – DK 92 (Golina)
DW 468	DK 91 (Gdańsk) – Sopot – Gdynia – Wejherowo – DK 6 ("Bożepole Wielkie" junction)
DW 469	Uniejów – Stary Gostków (Note: Listed as Gostków in the GDDKiA order.) – Wróblew
DW 470	DK 92 (Kościelec) – Marulew – Turek – DK 12 (Kalisz)
DW 471	DK 12 (Opatówek) – Koźminek – Lisków – DK 83 (Dąbrowa)
DW 472	DW 468 – Gdańsk Lech Wałęsa Airport
DW 473	Koło – Dąbie – Uniejów – Szadek – Łask – Piotrków Trybunalski
DW 474	DK 6 – DW 468 (City/town limits at Gdynia)
DW 475	DW 488 (Zgierz) – Aleksandrów Łódzki – DK 72 – ... – DK 72 – DK 14 ("Pabianice Północ" junction)
DW 475	Pęgów railway station – DW 342; annulled
DW 476	DK 74 – Bełchatów – DK 74; old routing of DK 74
DW 477	Złoczew – DK 8
DW 478	DK 83 (Dąbrowa) – Księża Wólka – Krępa
DW 479	Dąbrówka – Sieradz
DW 480	Sieradz – Widawa – Szczerców
DW 481	Łask – Widawa – Widoradz (Note: The order states Widoradz Górny, currently incorporated into the village of Widoradz.)
DW 482	Łódź (city limits) – Łask - Zduńska Wola – Sieradz – Złoczew – Wieruszów – Kępno – DK 8 ("Syców Wschód" junction)
DW 483	Łask – Szczerców – Nowa Brzeźnica – DK 91 (Częstochowa, Wojska Polskiego Avenue)
DW 484	Buczek – Zelów – Bełchatów – Kamieńsk
DW 485	Pabianice – Wadlew – Bełchatów
DW 486	DK 43 (Wieluń) – Działoszyn
DW 487	Byczyna – Gorzów Śląski – Olesno
DW 488	DK 91 (Emilia) – Zgierz – Łódź – ... – Łódź – DK 8 ("Rzgów junction); former routing of DK 91
DW 488	DK 74 – Wieluń – DK 74; old routing of DK 74; lost voivodeship road status in late 2022
DW 489	DK 46 (Głębinów) – DK 41 (Niwnica); former DK 46 and DK 41
DW 490	Ostrów Wielkopolski (Sosnowa Street) – Przygodzice – DK 11 ("Przygodzice" junction)
DW 491	DK 42 (Działoszyn) – Łobodno – Częstochowa
DW 492	Ważne Młyny – Łobodno – Kłobuck – Wręczyca Wielka – Blachownia
DW 493	DK 11 (Kolonia Ciarki) – Olesno – DK 11 (Szyszków); former routing of DK 11
DW 494	Bierdzany – Olesno – Wręczyca Wielka – Częstochowa
DW 498	DK 16 (Grudziądz) – DK 55 (Grudziądz)
DW 499	DK 91 (Ostaszewo) – Sławkowo – DW 599 (Mirakowo)

=== 500–599 ===
DW 500	DK 7 – DK 22 (City/town limits at Elbląg)
DW 501	Przejazdowo – Gdańsk – Mikoszewo – Krynica Morska – Nowa Karczma
DW 502	Stegna – Nowy Dwór Gdański
DW 503	Elbląg – Tolkmicko – Pogrodzie
DW 504	Elbląg – Pogrodzie – Braniewo
DW 505	Frombork – Młynary – Pasłęk
DW 506	Chruściel – Stare Siedlisko – Nowica
DW 507	Braniewo – Pieniężno – Orneta – Dobre Miasto
DW 508	Jedwabno – Wielbark
DW 509	Elbląg – Młynary – Drwęczno
DW 510	Border crossing – Lelkowo – Pieniężno
DW 511	Border crossing – Górowo Iławeckie – Lidzbark Warmiński
DW 512	Pieniężno – Górowo Iławeckie – Bartoszyce – Szczurkowo
DW 513	Pasłęk – Orneta – Lidzbark Warmiński – Kiwity – Wozławki
DW 514	Rail station at Grudziądz Mniszek – DK 55
DW 515	Malbork – Dzierzgoń – Susz
DW 516	Rail station at Sztum – DK 55
DW 517	Sztum – Tropy Sztumskie
DW 518	Gniew – Vistula River – Janowo – Gurcz – Kwidzyn
DW 519	Stary Dzierzgoń – Małdyty – Morąg
DW 520	Prabuty – Kamieniec
DW 521	Kwidzyn – Prabuty – Susz – Iława
DW 522	Górki – Prabuty – Trumieje – Sobiewola
DW 523	Gardeja – Trumieje
DW 524	Brachlewo – Licze
DW 525	Rail station at Ryjewo – Szkaradowo Wielkie – DW 518
DW 526	Pasłęk – Śliwice – Lepno – Myślice – Przezmark
DW 527	Dzierzgoń – Rychliki – Pasłęk – Morąg – Łukta – Olsztyn
DW 528	Orneta – Miłakowo – Morąg
DW 529	DW 518 – Rail station at Brachlewo
DW 530	Ostróda – Łukta – Dobre Miasto
DW 531	Łukta – Podlejki
DW 532	Rail station at Kwidzyn – Rozpędziny – Sadlinki – Okrągła Łąka – Gardeja
DW 533	Okonin – Mełno
DW 534	Grudziądz – Wąbrzeźno – Golub Dobrzyń – Rypin
DW 535	Rail station at Rogóźno – DK 16
DW 536	Iława – Sampława
DW 537	Lubawa – Frygnowo – Pawłowo
DW 538	Radzyń Chełmiński – Łasin – Nowe Miasto Lubawskie – Uzdowo – Rozdroże
DW 539	Blinno – Ligowo – Tłuchowo
DW 540	Bielsk – Proboszczewice – Sikórz
DW 541	Lubawa – Lidzbark – Żuromin – Bieżuń – Sierpc – Tłuchowo – Dobrzyń nad Wisłą
DW 542	Rychnowo – Działdowo
DW 543	Paparzyn – Radzyń Chełmiński – Jabłonowo Pomorskie – Grzybno – Szabda
DW 544	Brodnica – Lidzbark – Działdowo – Mława – Przasnysz – Krasnosielc – Ostrołęka
DW 545	Działdowo – Nidzica – Jedwabno
DW 546	Zławieś Wielka – Rzęczkowo – Łubianka
DW 547	Rail station at Grudziądz Owczarki – DK 16
DW 548	Stolno – Wąbrzeźno – ... – Niedźwiedź – Pląchoty
DW 549	Fordon – Vistula River – Strzyżawa DW 551
DW 550	Chełmno – Brzozowo – Kokocko – Unisław
DW 551	Strzyżawa – Dąbrowa Chełmińska – Unisław – Wybcz – Chełmża – Wąbrzeźno
DW 552	Różankowo – Łysomice – Grębocin – Lubicz
DW 553	Toruń – Łubianka – Wybcz
DW 554	Orzechowo – Sierakowo – Kowalewo Pomorskie – Golub Dobrzyń – Kikół
DW 555	DW 559 Srebrna – Siecień – Murzynowo DK 62
DW 556	Ostrowite – Zbójno
DW 557	Rypin – Lipno
DW 558	Lipno – Dyblin
DW 559	Lipno – Jasień – Brudzeń Duży – Sikórz – Płock
DW 560	Brodnica – Rypin – Sierpc – Bielsk
DW 561	Bieżuń – Szumanie
DW 562	Szpetal Górny – Dobrzyń nad Wisłą – Biskupice – Płock
DW 563	Rypin – Żuromin – Mława
DW 564	Płock DW 562 – Vistula River – Popłacin DK 62
DW 565	Nowy Secymin – Vistula River – Chociszewo
DW 566	Rail station at Czernikowo – DK 10
DW 567	Płock – Rogozino – Ciółkowo – Góra
DW 568	Goślice – Ciółkowo
DW 569	Golub-Dobrzyń – Ciechocin – Dobrzejewice
DW 570	Wróblewo – Naruszewo – Czerwińsk nad Wisłą
DW 571	Naruszewo – Nasielsk – Winnica – Pułtusk
DW 572	Rail station at Lubicz – DK 10
DW 573	Nowy Duninów – Gostynin – Żychlin
DW 574	Dobrzyków – Gąbin – Szczawin Borowy-Kolonia
DW 575	Płock – Dobrzyków – Słubice – Iłów – Kamion – Nowa Wieś-Śladów – Secymin Polski (Note: Listed as Secemin Polski in the GDDKiA order.) – Kazuń Nowy
DW 576	Rail station at Unisław – DW 551
DW 577	Łąck – Gąbin – Sanniki – Ruszki
DW 578	Rail station at Ostromecko – DW 551
DW 579	Kazuń Polski DK 7 – Leszno – Błonie – Grodzisk Mazowiecki – Radziejowice
DW 580	Warsaw – Leszno – Kampinos – Żelazowa Wola – Sochaczew
DW 581	Gostynin – Łanięta – Krośniewice
DW 582	Rail station at Ostaszewo – DK 1
DW 583	Bedlno – Żychlin – Sanniki
DW 584	Sanniki – Kiernozia – Łowicz
DW 585	Rail station at Toruń Główny – DK 1
DW 586	Rail station at Brzoza Toruńska – DK 1
DW 587	annulled
DW 588	DW 232 Opalenie – Vistula River – Grabówko – Kwidzyn
DW 589	DK 1 Grzywna – Chełmża
DW 590	Barciany – Korsze – Reszel – Biskupiec
DW 591	Border crossing – Barciany – Kętrzyn – Mrągowo DK 59
DW 592	Bartoszyce – Kraskowo – Kętrzyn – Giżycko DK 59
DW 593	Miłakowo – Dobre Miasto – Jeziorany – Lutry – Reszel
DW 594	Bisztynek – Robawy – Kętrzyn
DW 595	Jeziorany – Barczewo
DW 596	Mnichowo – Bęsia – Biskupiec
DW 597	Rzęczkowo – Cichoradz – Siemoń – Unisław
DW 598	Olsztyn – Butryny – Zgniłocha
DW 599	Mirakowo – Grodno

=== 600–699 ===
DW 600	Mrągowo – Kałęczyn – Szczytno
DW 601	Babięta – Nawiady
DW 602	Mątowskie Pastwiska – DW 603
DW 603	Biała Góra – Sztum
DW 604	Nidzica – Wielbark
DW 605	Piekło – Vistula River – Biała Góra – Jarzębina
DW 606	Tralewo – Benowo
DW 607	Gurcz – Jałowiec – Ryjewo – Sztumska Wieś
DW 608	Ryjewo – Klecewko
DW 609	Mikołajki – Ukta
DW 610	Piecki – Ruciane-Nida
DW 611	Sadlinki – Bronisławowo
DW 612	Bronisławowo – Okrągła Łąka – DW 532
DW 614	Chorzele – Krukowo – Myszyniec
DW 615	Mława – Ciechanów
DW 616	Rębielin – Ciechanów
DW 617	Przasnysz – Ciechanów
DW 618	Gołymin Ośrodek – Pułtusk – Wyszków
DW 620	Nowe Miasto – Strzegocin – Przewodowo-Parcele
DW 621	Michałów-Reginów – Chechnówka; now a portion of DW 632
DW 621	Warsaw – Sękocin Nowy; downgraded to a powiat road
DW 622	Chrcynno – Szadki
DW 623	Rakowiec – Bielsk – Majewo – Lipia Góra – Barłożno – Mirotki
DW 624	Rail station at Beniaminów – Dąbkowizna – Wólka Radzymińska; annulled
DW 625	Loading ramp at Zielonka rail station – DW 634; downgraded to a gmina road
DW 626	Maków Mazowiecki – Nowa Wieś
DW 627	Ostrołęka – Ostrów Mazowiecka – Małkinia – Kosów Lacki – Sokołów Podlaski
DW 628	Rail station at Wołomin – DW 634
DW 629	Radzymin – Marki – Warsaw
DW 630	DK 85 (Nowy Dwór Mazowiecki) (Note: Pursuant to Order No. 7 of GDDKiA of April 2, 2026, DK 85 was decommissioned.) – Jabłonna
DW 631	Nowy Dwór Mazowiecki – Zegrze – Nieporęt – Marki – Warsaw
DW 632	Płońsk - Nowe Miasto - Nasielsk - Dębe - Legionowo - Rembelszczyzna - Marki
DW 633	Warsaw – Rembelszczyzna – Nieporęt
DW 634	Warsaw – Zielonka – Wołomin – Miąse – Tłuszcz – Wólka Kozłowska
DW 635	Radzymin – Wołomin
DW 636	Wola Rasztowska – Wólka Kozłowska – Jadów – Zawiszyn
DW 637	Warsaw – Stanisławów – Węgrów
DW 638	Sulejówek – Stara Miłosna
DW 639	Łomna Las – Vistula River – Skierdy
DW 640	Anusin – Radziwiłłówka – Border crossing
DW 641	Lipia Góra – Gąsiorki – Rzeżęcin
DW 642	Sterławki Wielkie – Ryn – Woźnice
DW 643	Wilkasy – Olszewo
DW 644	Majewo DW 623 – Królów Las – Morzeszczyn DW 234
DW 645	Myszyniec – Dęby – Nowogród – Łomża
DW 646	Turzno – Brzeżno
DW 647	Dęby – Kolno – Gromadzyn-Wykno – Stawiski
DW 648	Miastkowo – Nowogród – ... – Morgowniki – Korzeniste – Stawiski – Przytuły
DW 649	Pluskowęsy (Note: Listed as Pluskowasy in the GDDkIA order.) – Mlewo – Sierakowo
DW 650	Barciany – Węgorzewo – Banie Mazurskie – Gołdap
DW 651	Gołdap – Żytkiejmy – Szypliszki – Sejny
DW 652	Kowale Oleckie – Suwałki
DW 653	Sedranki – Bakałarzewo – Suwałki – Sejny – Poćkuny
DW 654	Silno – Grabowiec – Krusz – Złotoria – Kaszczorek – Toruń DK 10
DW 655	Kąp – Wydminy – Olecko – Raczki – Suwałki – Rutka – Tartak
DW 656	Staświny – Zelki – Ełk
DW 657	Złotoria – Lubicz Dolny (Note: Listed as Lubicz in the GDDKiA order.)
DW 658	DW 640 – Kudlicze – Pawłowicze – Grabarka – Kajanka
DW 659	Topczewo – Zalesie – Kiewłaki – Hodyszewo – Koboski – Nowe Piekuty – Kostry-Noski – Dąbrówka Kościelna
DW 661	Cimochy – Kalinowo
DW 663	Pomorze – Sejny
DW 664	Raczki – Augustów – Lipsk – Border crossing
DW 667	Nowa Wieś Ełcka – Drygały – Biała Piska
DW 668	Piątnica Poduchowna – Przytuły – Osowiec
DW 669	DK 8 – DW 676 (City/town limits at Białystok)
DW 670	Osowiec – Dąbrowa Białostocka – Nowy Dwór – Border crossing
DW 671	Sokolany – Korycin – Knyszyn – Stare Jeżewo – Sokoły
DW 672	Przewięź – Rudawka
DW 673	Lipsk – Dąbrowa Białostocka – Sokółka
DW 674	Sokółka – Krynki
DW 675	DK 8 – DK 19 (City/town limits at Białystok)
DW 676	Białystok – Supraśl – Krynki – Border crossing
DW 677	Łomża – Śniadowo – Ostrów Mazowiecka
DW 678	Białystok – Sokoły – Wysokie Mazowieckie
DW 679	Łomża – Podgórze (Note: Listed as Podgórz in the GDDKiA order.) – Gać – Mężenin
DW 680	Góra Kalwaria – Vistula River – Ostrówek
DW 681	Roszki-Wodźki – Łapy – Poświętne – Brańsk – Ciechanowiec
DW 682	Łapy – Turośń Dolna – Markowszczyzna
DW 683	Prażmów – Wola Prażmowska – Wola Wągrodzka – Kamionka – Uwieliny – Gabrielin (Note: Listed as Gabryelin in the GDDKiA order.) – Julianów – Czachówek – Rail station at Czachówek Wschodni – Sobików – Dębówka
DW 685	Zabłudów – Narew – Nowosady – Hajnówka – Kleszczele
DW 686	Zajma – Michałowo – Jałówka
DW 687	Juszkowy Gród – Bondary – Narewka – Nowosady
DW 689	Bielsk Podlaski – Hajnówka – Białowieża – Border crossing
DW 690	Czyżew-Osada – Ciechanowiec – Siemiatycze
DW 691	Pionki – Laski – Garbatka-Letnisko (Note: Listed as Garbatka in the GDDKiA order.) – Podlas – Bąkowiec – Opactwo
DW 692	Drohiczyn – Dziadkowice
DW 693	Kleszczele – Siemiatycze
DW 694	Przyjmy – Brok – Ciechanowiec
DW 695	Kosów Lacki – Ceranów
DW 696	Węgrów – Chodów
DW 697	Liw – Sinołęka
DW 698	Siedlce – Łosice – Konstantynów – Terespol
DW 699	Niemianowice – Gzowice – Piotrowice – Jedlnia Letnisko – Siczki

=== 700–799 ===
DW 700	DK 2 – Rail station at Płochocin – Józefów – Rokitno
DW 701	Józefów – Domaniew – Żbików – Duchnice – Ożarów – Strzykuły
DW 702	Kutno – Piątek – Zgierz
DW 703	Porczyny – Poddębice – Stary Gostków – Łęczyca – Piątek – Łowicz
DW 704	Jamno – Kołacin – Brzeziny
DW 705	Śladów – Sochaczew – Skierniewice – Jeżów
DW 706	DW 634 – rail station at Warszawa Okęcie; annulled
DW 707	Skierniewice – Rawa Mazowiecka – Nowe Miasto nad Pilicą
DW 708	Ozorków – Warszyce – Stryków – Brzeziny
DW 709	DW 722 – rail station in Piaseczno; annulled
DW 710	Łódź – Konstantynów Łódzki – Szadek – Warta – Błaszki
DW 711	DW 801 – rail station at Warszawa Falenica; downgraded to powiat road
DW 712	DW 721 Habdzin – Gassy – Vistula River – Karczew DW 801
DW 713	Łódź – Andrespol – Kurowice – Ujazd – Tomaszów Mazowiecki – Januszewice
DW 714	Rzgów – Kurowice
DW 715	Brzeziny – Budziszewice (Note: Listed as Budziszowice in the GDDKiA order.) – Ujazd
DW 716	Koluszki – Rokiciny – Piotrków Trybunalski
DW 717	Aleje Jerozolimskie, Warsaw; downgraded to powiat road
DW 718	Borzęcin – Ołtarzew – Pruszków
DW 719	Warsaw – Pruszków – Żyrardów – Kamion
DW 720	Błonie – Brwinów – Otrębusy – Nadarzyn
DW 721	Nadarzyn – Piaseczno – Wiązowna – Duchnów
DW 722	Piaseczno – Lesznowola – Grójec
DW 723	Sandomierz DK 77 – Tarnobrzeg
DW 724	Warsaw – Konstancin-Jeziorna – Góra Kalwaria
DW 725	Rawa Mazowiecka – Biała Rawska – Belsk Duży
DW 726	Rawa Mazowiecka – Inowłódz – Opoczno – Żarnów
DW 727	Klwów – Przysucha – Szydłowiec – Wierzbica
DW 728	Grójec – Nowe Miasto nad Pilicą – Końskie – Łopuszno – Jędrzejów
DW 729	Przystałowice Duże – Potworów DK 48
DW 730	Skurów – Jasieniec – Warka – Głowaczów
DW 731	Potycz – Warka – Białobrzegi
DW 732	Stary Gózd – Stara Błotnica – Kaszów – Przytyk
DW 733	Zakrzew – Wolanów – Kowala – Skaryszew – Karszówka
DW 734	DK 79 Baniocha – Kawęczyn – Dębówka – Vistula River – Nadbrzeż – Otwock Wielki – Wygoda DW 801
DW 735	Rail station at Ożarów – DK 2
DW 736	Warka – Rozniszew – Magnuszew – Vistula River – Podłęż DW 801
DW 737	Radom – Pionki – Kozienice
DW 738	Słowiki Nowe (Note: The GDDKiA order uses the old name "Nowe Słowiki".) – Góra Puławska
DW 739	DK 79 – Brzumin – Vistula River – Piwonin – Sobienie-Jeziory – Osieck DW 805
DW 740	Radom – Przytyk – Potworów DK 48
DW 741	DW 738 – Bronowice (Note: Listed as Bronowice Łęka in the GDDKiA order.) – Łęka – Vistula River – Wólka Gołębska – DW 801
DW 742	Przygłów – Łęczno – Ręczno – Włoszczowa – Nagłowice
DW 743	Góra Puławska – Karczunki (Note: Karczunki does not exist (no entry in TERYT).) – Sadłowice – Nasiłów (Note: Listed as Nasilków in the GDDKiA order.) – Vistula River – Bochotnica – DW 824
DW 744	Radom – Wierzbica – Starachowice
DW 745	Dąbrowa – Masłów – Radlin
DW 746	Żarnów – Końskie
DW 747	Iłża – Lipsko – Solec nad Wisłą – Opole Lubelskie – Bełżyce – Konopnica
DW 748	Ruda Strawczyńska – Strawczyn – Kostomłoty
DW 749	Końskie – Przysucha
DW 750	Ćmińsk – Samsonów – Zagnańsk – Barcza
DW 751	Suchedniów – Bodzentyn – Nowa Słupia – Ostrowiec Świętokrzyski
DW 752	Górno – Bodzentyn – Rzepin Pierwszy
DW 753	Wola Jachowa – Bieliny – Huta Nowa – Bartoszowiny – Milanowska Wólka (Note: Listed as Wólka Milanowska in the GDDKiA order.) – Stara Słupia
DW 754	Ostrowiec Świętokrzyski – Pętkowice – Solec nad Wisłą – Kłudzie – Boiska – Wola Solecka I – Wola Solecka II – Gołębiów DK 79
DW 755	Ostrowiec Świętokrzyski – Ożarów – Zawichost – Kosin DW 854
DW 756	Starachowice – Nowa Słupia – Łagów – Szydłów – Stopnica
DW 757	Opatów – Iwaniska – Staszów – Stopnica
DW 758	Iwaniska – Klimontów – Koprzywnica – Ciszyca – Vistula River – Tarnobrzeg DW 871
DW 759	DW 777 – Piotrowice – Vistula River – Zabełcze – Opoka Duża DK 54
DW 760	Rail station at Pruszków – DW 718
DW 761	Kielce – Piekoszów
DW 762	Kielce – Chęciny – Małogoszcz
DW 763	Chęciny – Morawica
DW 764	Kielce – Suków – Raków – Staszów – Połaniec
DW 765	Chmielnik – Szydłów – Staszów – Osiek
DW 766	Morawica – Kije – Pińczów – Węchadłów
DW 767	Pińczów – Busko-Zdrój
DW 768	Jędrzejów – Węchadłów – Skalbmierz – Koszyce – Brzesko
DW 769	Rail station at Góra Kalwaria – DK 79
DW 770	Drożejowice – Czarnocin – Krzyż
DW 771	Wiślica – Strożyska
DW 773	Sieniczno – Sułoszowa – Skała – Wesoła
DW 774	Zabierzów – Kryspinów
DW 775	Słomniki – Proszowice – Nowe Brzesko – Ispina
DW 776	Kraków – Proszowice – Kazimierza Wielka – Busko-Zdrój
DW 777	Sandomierz – DK 74 Annopol
DW 778	Rail station at Tarczyn – DK 7
DW 779	Rail station at Mszczonów – DK 50
DW 780	Kraków – Alwernia – Chełmek – Chełm Śląski DW 934
DW 781	Chrzanów – Babice – Zator – Andrychów – Łękawica
DW 782	Rail station at Bąkowiec – Bąkowiec; annulled
DW 783	Olkusz – Wolbrom – Miechów – Racławice – Skalbmierz
DW 784	Radomsko – Ciężkowice – Święta Anna
DW 785	Ciężkowice – Żytno – Maluszyn – Włoszczowa
DW 786	Częstochowa – Święta Anna – Koniecpol – Włoszczowa – Łopuszno – Ruda Strawczyńska – Kielce
DW 787	DW 737 – Rail station at Pionki – Suskowola – Sucha – Zwoleń
DW 788	Rail station at Sarnów – DW 738
DW 789	Brusiek – Kalety – Woźniki – Koziegłowy – Żarki – Lelów
DW 790	Dąbrowa Górnicza – Ogrodzieniec – Pilica
DW 791	Wanaty – Zawiercie – Ogrodzieniec – Olkusz – Trzebinia
DW 792	Żarki – Kotowice – Kroczyce
DW 793	Św. Anna – Żarki – Myszków – Siewierz
DW 794	Koniecpol – Lelów – Pradła – Pilica – Wolbrom – Skała – Kraków
DW 795	Secemin – Szczekociny
DW 796	Zawiercie – Dąbrowa Górnicza
DW 797	DK 50 – Celestynów
DW 798	Otwock Mały – Karczew
DW 799	Dziecinów – Kosumce – Ostrówek DK 50

=== 800–899 ===
DW 800	Parysów railway station – DW 805
DW 801	Warsaw – Karczew – Wilga – Maciejowice – Dęblin – Puławy
DW 802	Mińsk Mazowiecki – Seroczyn
DW 803	Siedlce – Stoczek Łukowski
DW 804	Pilawa railway station – DW 805
DW 805	Warszawice – Osieck – Pilawa – Parysów – Wilchta
DW 806	Łuków – Międzyrzec Podlaski
DW 807	Maciejowice – Sobolew – Żelechów – Łuków
DW 808	Łuków – Serokomla – Kock
DW 809	Lublin – Krasienin – Kierzkówka – Przytoczno
DW 810	Garwolin railway station – DK 76; downgraded to a powiat road in 2025; now a gmina road
DW 811	Sarnaki – Konstantynów – Biała Podlaska
DW 812	Biała Podlaska – Wisznice – Włodawa – Chełm – Rejowiec – Krasnystaw
DW 813	Międzyrzec Podlaski – Parczew – Ostrów Lubelski – Łęczna
DW 814	Radzyń Podlaski – Suchowola – Żminne
DW 815	Wisznice – Parczew – Siemień – Lubartów
DW 816	Terespol – Kodeń – Sławatycze – Włodawa – Dorohusk – Horodło – Zosin
DW 817	Kłudzie – ... – Kępa Gostecka – Kamień; annulled
DW 818	Przewłoka – Wyryki-Kolonia – Adampol; downgraded to powiat road 1638L in 2020
DW 819	Parczew – Kołacze – Łowcza – Wola Uhruska
DW 820	Sosnowica-Dwór – Łęczna
DW 821	Klementynów – Ostrów Lubelski
DW 822	DK 12 ("Lublin Tatary" junction) – Lublin – Lublin Airport (Note: Listed as Świdnik Airport in the GDDKiA order.)
DW 823	DK 48 – Wólka Wojcieszkowska – Vistula river – DW 801 (Borowa)
DW 824	Żyrzyn – Puławy – Opole Lubelskie – Józefów nad Wisłą – Annopol
DW 825	Kamień – Józefów nad Wisłą; lost voivodeship road status in 2023
DW 826	Przybysławice (Note: Listed as Markuszów in the GDDKiA order.) – Nałęczów
DW 827	Sadurki – Bełżyce
DW 828	Bogucin (Note: Listed as Garbów in the GDDKiA order.) – Krasienin – Niemce – Jawidz
DW 829	Łucka – Łęczna – Biskupice
DW 830	Lublin – Nałęczów – Bochotnica
DW 831	Dęblin railway station (Note: Listed as Deblin Rycice railway station in the GDDKiA order.) – DW 801
DW 832	Wola Rudzka – Poniatowa – Krężnica Okrągła
DW 833	Chodel – Kraśnik
DW 834	Bełżyce – Niedrzwica Duża – Bychawa – Stara Wieś II (Note: Listed as Stara Wieś III in the GDDKiA order.)
DW 835	Lublin – Wysokie – Biłgoraj – Sieniawa – Przeworsk – Kańczuga – Dynów – Grabownica Starzeńska
DW 836	Bychawa – Kębłów
DW 837	Piaski – Żółkiewka-Osada (Note: Listed as Żółkiewka Wieś in the GDDKiA order.) – Nielisz – Sitaniec
DW 838	Głębokie – Dorohucza – Trawniki – Fajsławice
DW 839	Cyców – Siedliszcze – Marynin – Pawłów – Rejowiec
DW 840	Rail station at Zarzeka – DW 801
DW 841	Cyców – Wierzbica – Staw
DW 842	Rudnik Szlachecki – Wysokie – Krasnystaw
DW 843	Chełm – Kraśniczyn – Zamość
DW 844	Chełm – Hrubieszów – Witków – Dołhobyczów – Border crossing
DW 845	DW 801 – Gołąb (Note: Listed as Gołąb Piaski in the GDDKiA order.) – Gołąb railway station
DW 846	Małochwiej Duży – Wojsławice – Teratyn
DW 847	DW 801 – Rail station at Puławy Azoty
DW 848	Tarnawa Mała – Turobin – Sułów – Szczebrzeszyn
DW 849	Zamość – Jacnia – Józefów – Wola Obszańska
DW 850	Tomaszów Lubelski – Józefówka – Alojzów
DW 851	Puławy railway station (Note: The name mentioned in the GDDKiA order, Puławy Ruda railway station, is incorrect.) – DW 874 (Note: Still listed as DK 12 in the GDDKiA order.)
DW 852	Józefówka – Nowosiółki – Witków
DW 853	Nowy Majdan – Tomaszów Lubelski
DW 854	Annopol – Kosin – Antoniów – Gorzyce
DW 855	Olbięcin – Zaklików – Stalowa Wola
DW 856	Antoniów – Radomyśl nad Sanem – Dąbrowa Rzeczycka
DW 857	Zaklików – Modliborzyce
DW 858	Zarzecze – Biłgoraj – Zwierzyniec – Szczebrzeszyn
DW 859	Zajezierze koło Dęblina rail station – Zajezierze; decommissioned in 2020
DW 860	DW 830 – Rail station at Małe Sadurki
DW 861	Bojanów – Kopki
DW 862	Tabor DK 50 – Podbiel – Osieck; downgraded to a powiat road in 2025
DW 863	Kopki – Krzeszów – Tarnogród – Cieszanów
DW 864	Krościenko Wyżne – Zboiska
DW 864	Nowy Lubliniec – Żuków; annulled
DW 865	Jarosław – Oleszyce – Cieszanów – Bełżec
DW 866	Dachnów – Lubaczów – Krowica Hołodowska – Border crossing
DW 867	Sieniawa – Mołodycz – Oleszyce – Lubaczów – Podemszczyzna – Werchrata – Hrebenne
DW 868	Słomczyn – Cieciszew – Imielin – Gassy; downgraded to a powiat road in 2023
DW 869	DK 19 – DK 9
DW 870	Sieniawa – Wiązownica – Jarosław
DW 871	Nagnajów – Tarnobrzeg – Grębów – Stalowa Wola
DW 872	DK 9 Łoniów – Świniary – Vistula river – Baranów Sandomierski – Wola Baranowska – Majdan Królewski – Bojanów – Nisko
DW 873	Pilawa – Zalesie Górne
DW 874	Zarzecze – Puławy – DW 826 (Przybysławice) – … – DK 12/DK 19 ("Sławinek" junction) – DW 809 (Lublin); former routing of DK 12
DW 875	Mielec – Kolbuszowa – Sokołów Małopolski – Leżajsk
DW 876	Chudolipie DK 50 – Piotrkowice – Many – Tarczyn – Łoś DW 722
DW 877	Naklik – Leżajsk – Łańcut – Dylągówka – Szklary
DW 878	Rzeszów – Dylągówka
DW 879	Osieck railway station – DW 805; annulled
DW 880	Jarosław – Pruchnik
DW 881	Sokołów Małopolski – Łańcut – Kańczuga – Pruchnik – Żurawica
DW 882	Warszawska Street (Rzeszów) – DK 97 (Rzeszów)
DW 883	DK 19 ("Rzeszów Południe" junction) – DK 19 (Rzeszów)
DW 884	Przemyśl – Dubiecko – Bachórz – Domaradz
DW 885	Przemyśl – Hermanowice – Border crossing
DW 886	Domaradz – Brzozów – Sanok
DW 887	Brzozów – Rymanów – Daliowa
DW 888	Święcice – Myszczyn – Zaborów
DW 889	Sieniawa – Bukowsko – Szczawne
DW 890	Kuźmina – Krościenko
DW 892	Zagórz – Komańcza
DW 893	Lesko – Baligród – Cisna
DW 894	Hoczew – Wołkowyja – Czarna
DW 895	Uherce Mineralne – Solina – Myczków
DW 896	Ustrzyki Dolne – Czarna – Ustrzyki Górne
DW 897	Tylawa – Komańcza – Radoszyce – Cisna – Ustrzyki Górne – Wołosate – Border crossing
DW 898	Stare Babice – Mościska – Warsaw DW 637
DW 899	Cybulice Małe – DW 575

=== 900–993 ===
DW 900	Raj – Kolonia Nadwiślańska – Piotrawin; annulled
DW 901	Olesno – Dobrodzień – Zawadzkie – Wielowieś – Pyskowice – DK 78 (Gliwice)
DW 902	DK 79 (Katowice) – Chorzów – Świętochłowice – Ruda Śląska – Zabrze – road 7213S (Gliwice)
DW 904	Blachownia – Rększowice – Wanaty
DW 905	Herby – Boronów – Piasek
DW 906	Lubliniec – Koszęcin – Piasek
DW 907	Wygoda – Koszęcin – Kieleczka – ... – Wielowieś – Toszek – Niewiesze
DW 908	Częstochowa – DK 78 (Tarnowskie Góry)
DW 910	DK 86 (Będzin) – DK 94 (Dąbrowa Górnicza)
DW 911	Świerklaniec – Piekary Śląskie – Bytom
DW 912	Tarnowskie Góry – Świerklaniec
DW 913	Pyrzowice (Airport) – Pomłynie – Sarnów
DW 915	Ciechowice – Zawada Książęca – DW 919
DW 916	Racibórz – Samborowice – Border crossing
DW 917	Racibórz – Krzanowice – Border crossing
DW 919	Racibórz – Rudy – Sośnicowice
DW 920	Rudy – Rybnik
DW 921	Przerycie – Knurów – Zabrze
DW 922	Kuźnia Raciborska – Nędza
DW 923	Raszczyce – Nowa Wieś – Wodzisław Śląski
DW 924	Kuźnia Nieborowska – Stanowice – Żory
DW 925	Bytom – Ruda Śląska – Orzesze – Rybnik
DW 926	Orzesze – Orzesze (Zawiść)
DW 927	DK 44 (Mikołów) – DK 81 (Mikołów)
DW 927	Bujaków – Mikołów
DW 928	Mikołów – Tychy
DW 929	Rybnik – Świerklany Górne
DW 930	Świerklany Dolne – Mszana
DW 931	Tychy – Pszczyna
DW 932	Wodzisław Śląski – Świerklany Dolne – Świerklany Górne – Żory
DW 933	Rzuchów – Wodzisław Śląski – Jastrzębie-Zdrój – Pszczyna – Oświęcim – Chrzanów
DW 934	Mysłowice DK 79 – Mysłowice (Kosztowy) – DK 1 – ... – DK 1 – Imielin – Chełm Śląski – Bieruń DK 44
DW 935	Racibórz – Rybnik – Żory – Pszczyna
DW 936	Wodzisław Śląski – Syrynia – Krzyżanowice – Border crossing
DW 937	DW 933 Mszana – Jastrzębie-Zdrój – Hażlach
DW 938	Pawłowice – Pruchna – Cieszyn
DW 939	Zbytków – Strumień – Wisła Wielka – Pszczyna
DW 940	DK 69 (Note: DK 69 ceased to exist in 2016, it is now part of DK 1.) (Bielsko-Biała) – DK 52 (Bielsko-Biała)
DW 941	Skoczów – Wisła – Istebna
DW 942	DK 52 (Bielsko-Biała) – DW 945 (Rybarzowice) – Buczkowice – Szczyrk – Salmopol – DW 941 (Wisła)
DW 943	Border crossing – Istebna – Koniaków – Laliki
DW 944	DW 942 (Bielsko-Biała) – S52 (Cieszyn); former DK 1, annulled
DW 945	DW 942 (Rybarzowice) – DW 946 (Żywiec) – ... – Jeleśnia – Korbielów – Border crossing
DW 946	DK 1 (Żywiec) – DW 945 (Żywiec) – Sucha Beskidzka
DW 947	Kamesznica – border crossing; annulled
DW 948	Oświęcim – Kęty – ... – Kobiernice – Tresna – Żywiec (Oczków)
DW 949	Jawiszowice – Osiek – Polanka Wielka – Przeciszów
DW 953	Skawina – Kalwaria Zebrzydowska
DW 955	Sułkowice – Jawornik
DW 956	Biertowice – Sułkowice – Zembrzyce
DW 957	Białka – Zawoja – Jabłonka – Czarny Dunajec – Nowy Targ
DW 958	Chabówka – Czarny Dunajec – Chochołów – Zakopane
DW 959	Chochołów – Border crossing
DW 960	Czarna Góra – Bukowina Tatrzańska – Łysa Polana – Border crossing
DW 961	Poronin – Bukowina Tatrzańska
DW 962	Jabłonka – Lipnica Wielka – Border crossing
DW 964	Kasina Wielka – Dobczyce – Wieliczka – Niepołomice – Ispina – Zielona – Szczurowa – Biskupice Radłowskie
DW 965	Zielona – Bochnia – Limanowa
DW 966	Wieliczka – Gdów – Muchówka – Tymowa
DW 967	Myślenice – Dobczyce – Łapczyca
DW 968	Lubień – Mszana Dolna – Kamienica – Zabrzeż
DW 969	Nowy Targ – Czorsztyn – Krościenko – Zabrzeż – Stary Sącz – Brzezna
DW 971	Krynica – Muszyna – Piwniczna
DW 973	Busko-Zdrój – Nowy Korczyn – Żabno – ... – Niedomice – Tarnów
DW 975	Dąbrowa Tarnowska – Biskupice Radłowskie – Wojnicz – Zakliczyn – Dąbrowa
DW 977	Tarnów – Tuchów – Gromnik – Zborowice – Moszczenica – Gorlice – Konieczna – Border crossing
DW 979	Moszczenica – Zagórzany
DW 980	Jurków – Charzewice – ... – Zakliczyn – Gromnik – Biecz
DW 981	Zborowice – Grybów – Krzyżówka – Krynica
DW 982	Szczucin – Sadkowa Góra – Jaślany
DW 983	Sadkowa Góra – Mielec
DW 984	Lisia Góra – Radomyśl Wielki – Mielec
DW 985	Nagnajów – Baranów Sandomierski – Mielec – Dębica
DW 986	Tuszyma – Ropczyce – Wiśniowa
DW 987	Kolbuszowa – Sędziszów Małopolski
DW 988	Babica – Strzyżów – Wiśniowa – Frysztak – Warzyce
DW 989	Strzyżów – Lutcza
DW 990	Twierdza – Krosno
DW 991	Lutcza – Krosno
DW 992	Jasło – Zarzecze – Nowy Żmigród – Kąty – Krempna – Świątkowa Mała – Grab – Border crossing
DW 993	Gorlice – Nowy Żmigród – Dukla

... - discontinuity of route

== See also ==
- Roads and expressways in Poland
