= Voivodeship road 121 =

Road in Poland

Voivodeship Road 121
- Droga wojewódzka nr 121

Route information
- Length: 18 km (11 mi)
- Existed: 1985 or 1986–present

Major junctions
- From: DW 122 Banie
- To: DK 31 Pniewo

Location
- Country: Poland

Highway system
- National roads in Poland; Voivodeship roads

Voivodeship road 121 is a 18 kilometres (11 miles) long road in Poland.
