= Raszczyce =

- Village
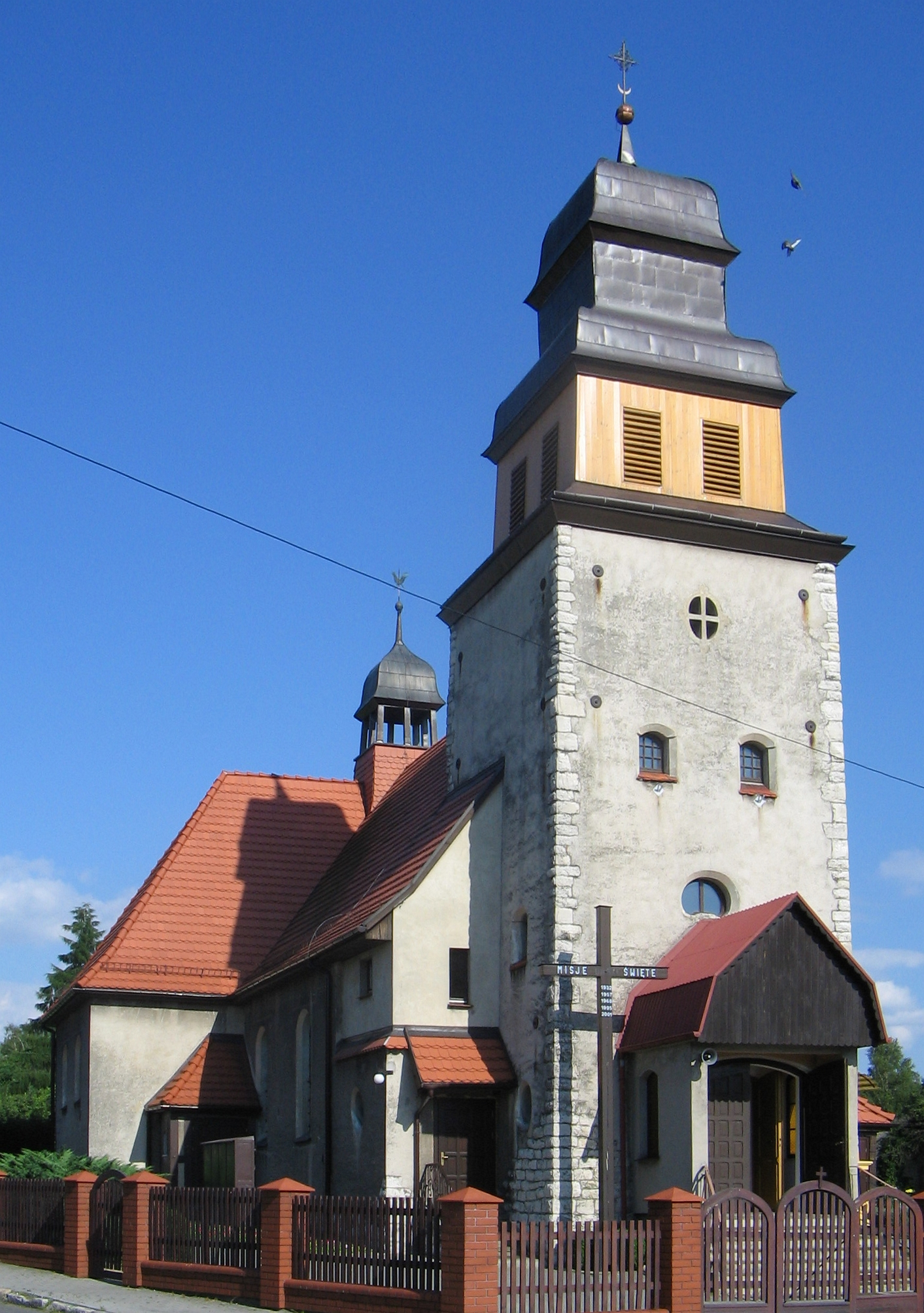
- Saints Simon and Jude church

- Location within Poland
- Coordinates: 50°7′N 18°18′E
- Country: Poland
- Voivodeship: Silesian
- County: Rybnik
- Gmina: Lyski
- Population: 1,100

Raszczyce [raʂˈt͡ʂɨt͡sɛ] is a village in Gmina Lyski, within Rybnik County, Silesian Voivodeship, in southern Poland.
