= Wawelno =

Wawelno Bowallno
- Village
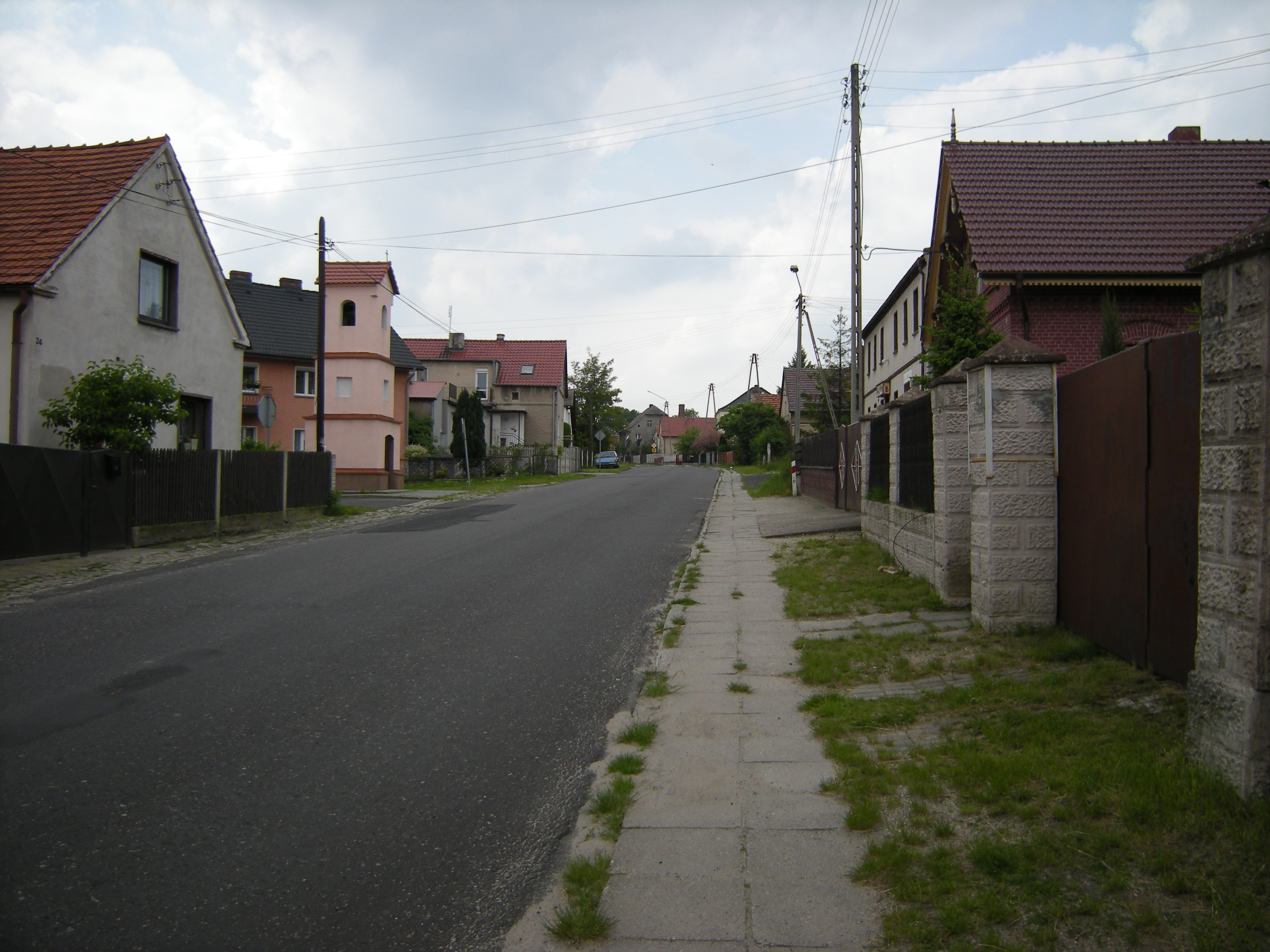
- Center of the village

- Location within Poland
- Coordinates: 50°39′24″N 17°45′42″E
- Country: Poland
- Voivodeship: Opole
- County: Opole
- Gmina: Komprachcice

Population (approx.)
  - Total: 1,200
- Time zone: UTC+1 (CET)
  - Summer (DST): UTC+2 (CEST)
- Vehicle registration: OPO

Wawelno [vaˈvɛlnɔ] is a village in the administrative district of Gmina Komprachcice, within Opole County, Opole Voivodeship, in southern Poland.

The earliest record of the village comes from c. 1300. The name is of Polish origin, and comes from the word wąwel. In the past, it was known in Polish as Wawelno, Wąwolno and Bowalno. Under Nazi Germany, in 1936, it was renamed Walldorf to erase traces of Polish origin.
