= Gassy =

- Village
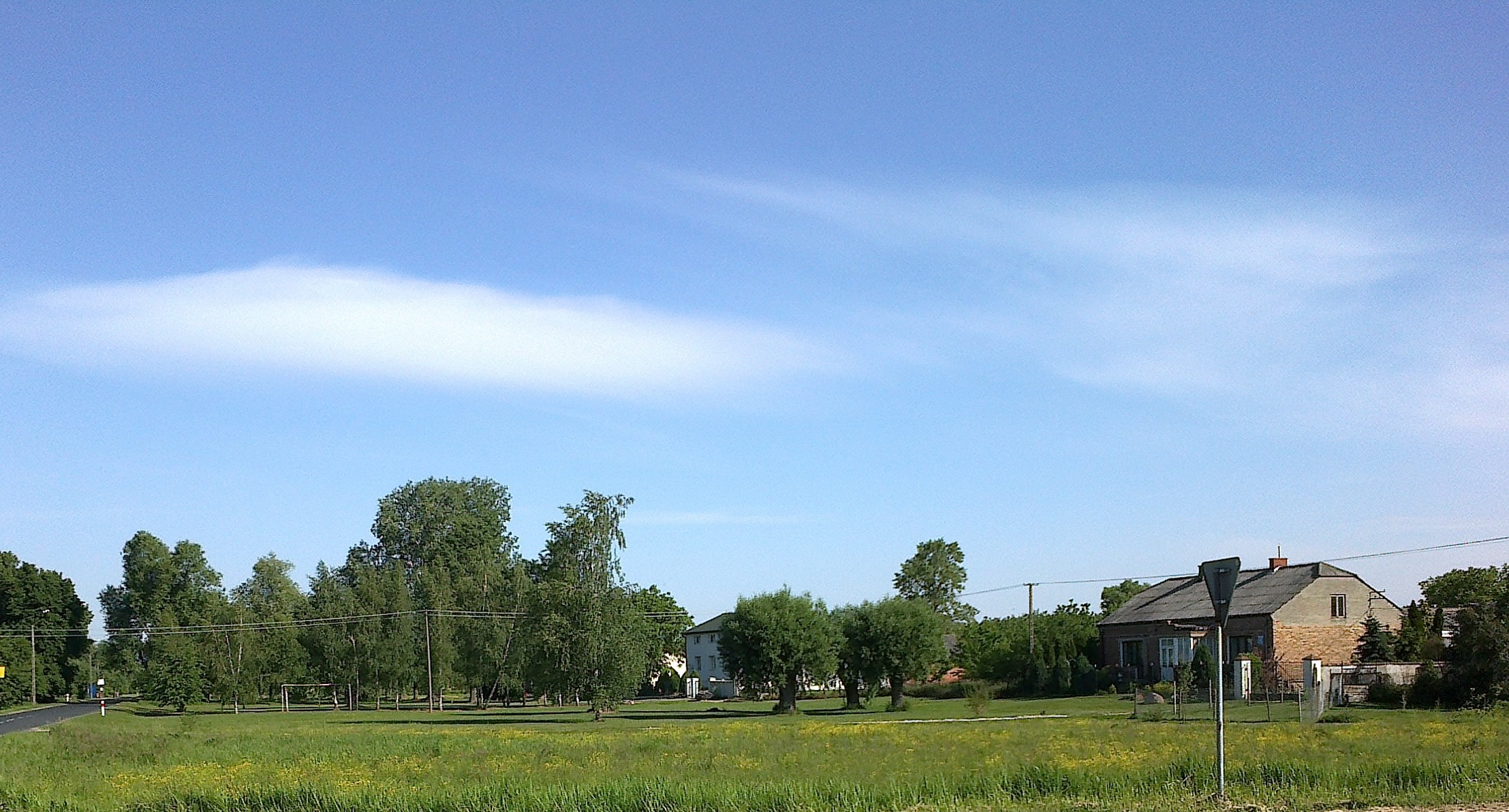

- Location within Poland
- Coordinates: 52°5′0″N 21°11′53″E
- Country: Poland
- Voivodeship: Masovian
- County: Piaseczno
- Gmina: Konstancin-Jeziorna

Gassy [ˈɡassɨ] is a village in the administrative district of Gmina Konstancin-Jeziorna, within Piaseczno County, Masovian Voivodeship, in east-central Poland.

In 2014, a ferry to Karczew started service. According to people working on this project, the main problem was the official "no-entry" rule for cars, despite a road leading there. Without cars it was not economically reasonable to open, and after this problem was solved by removing the rule, the ferry started.
