= Dobrzyków =

- Village
- Location within Poland
- Coordinates: 52°28′30″N 19°44′44″E
- Country: Poland
- Voivodeship: Masovian
- County: Płock
- Gmina: Gąbin
- Elevation: 49 m (161 ft)
- Population: 616

Dobrzyków [dɔˈbʐɨkuf] is a village in the administrative district of Gmina Gąbin, within Płock County, Masovian Voivodeship, in east-central Poland.
