= Góra Puławska =

Village in Lublin Voivodeship, Poland

- Village
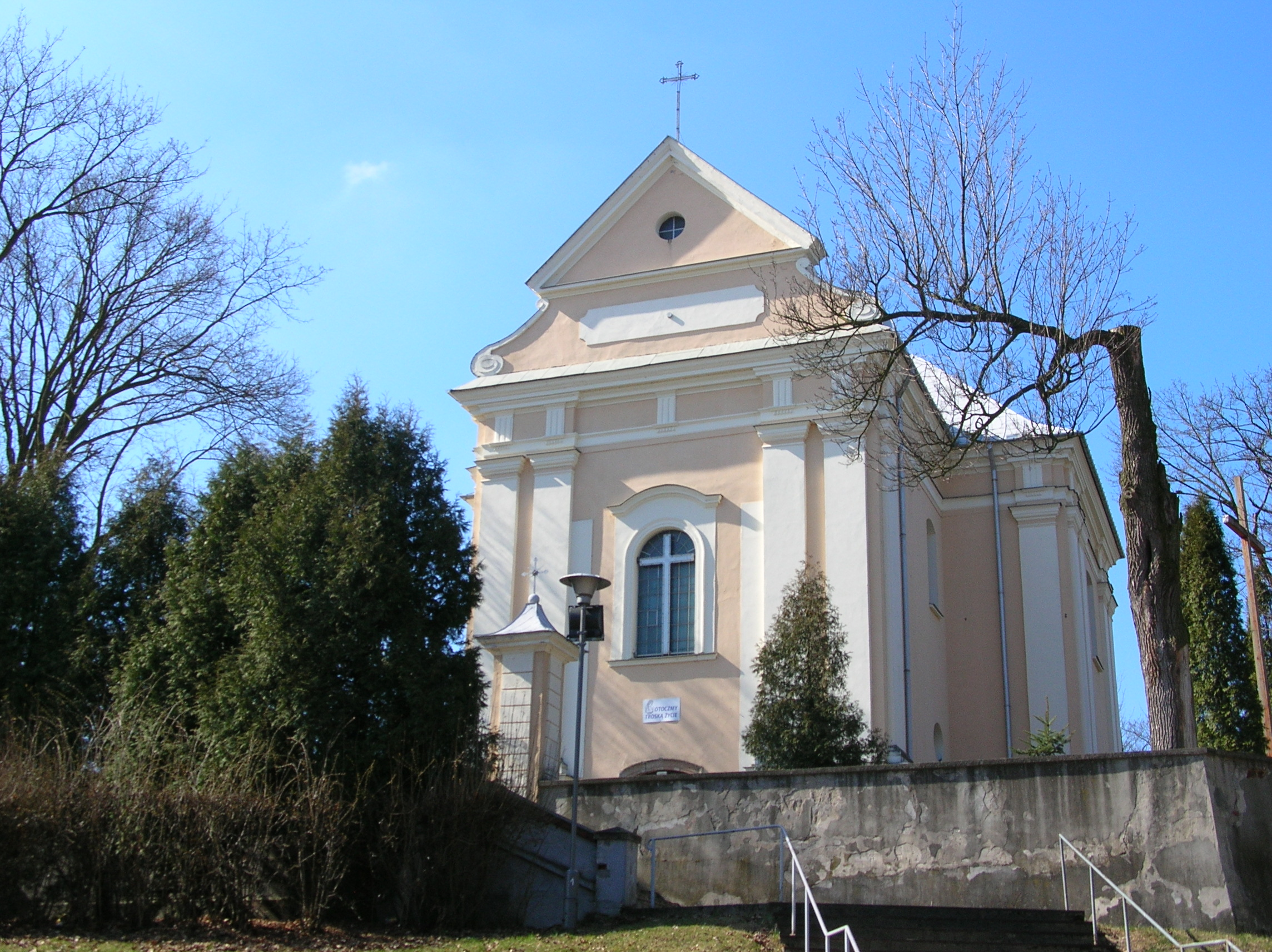
- Church of Saint Adalbert from 1781

- Location within Poland
- Coordinates: 51°24′N 21°55′E
- Country: Poland
- Voivodeship: Lublin
- County: Puławy
- Gmina: Puławy

Population
  - Total: 2,100

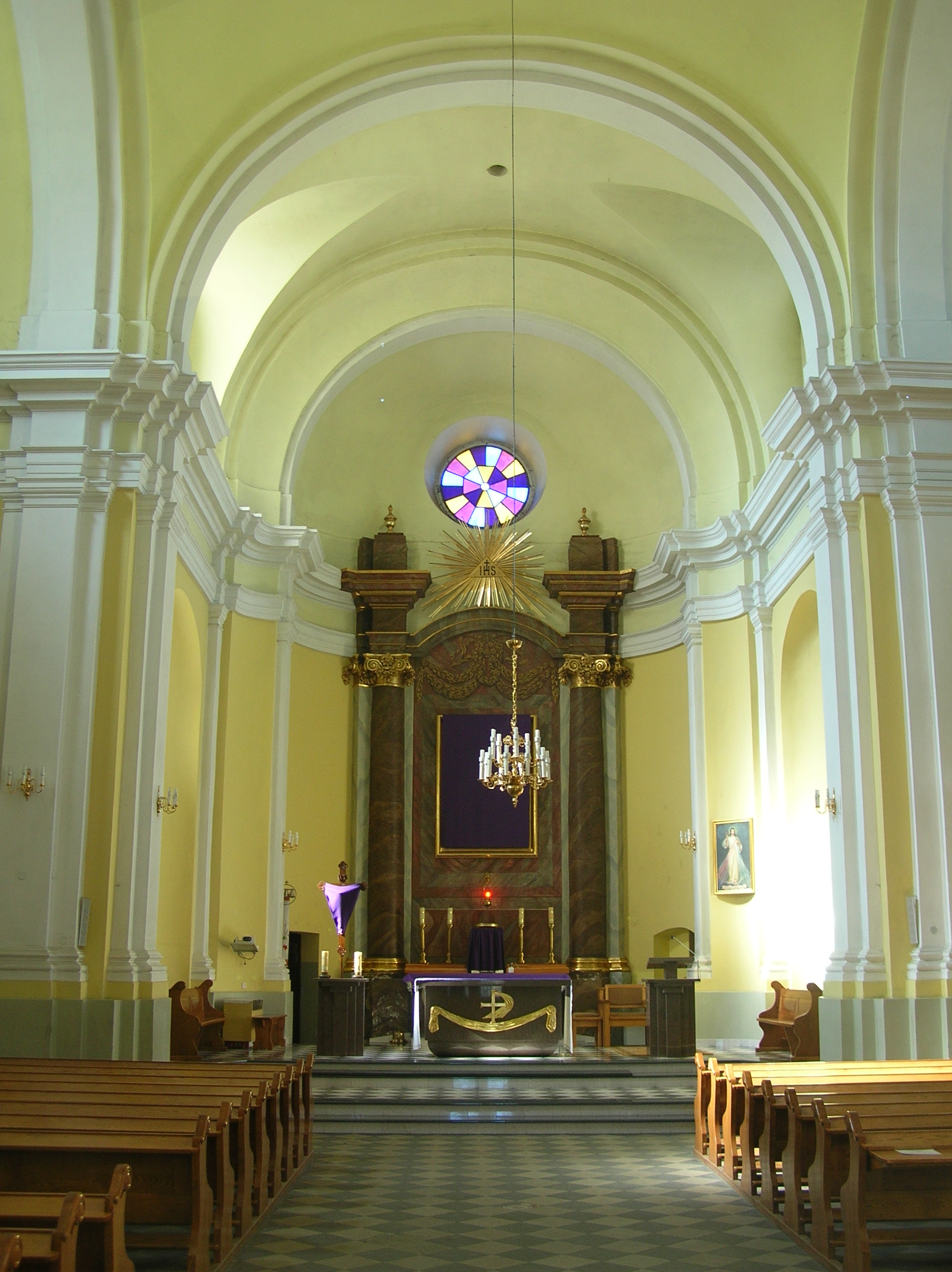
Interior of the Church of Saint Adalbert

Góra Puławska [ˈɡura puˈwafska] is a village in the administrative district of Gmina Puławy, within Puławy County, Lublin Voivodeship, in eastern Poland.
