= Wysokie, Lubusz Voivodeship =

Wysokie
- Village
- Location within Poland
- Coordinates: 52°1′N 15°28′E
- Country: Poland
- Voivodeship: Lubusz
- County: Zielona Góra
- Gmina: Czerwieńsk
- Population: 136

Wysokie [vɨˈsɔkʲɛ] is a village in the administrative district of Gmina Czerwieńsk, within Zielona Góra County, Lubusz Voivodeship, in western Poland.
