= Nowe Dymaczewo =

- Village
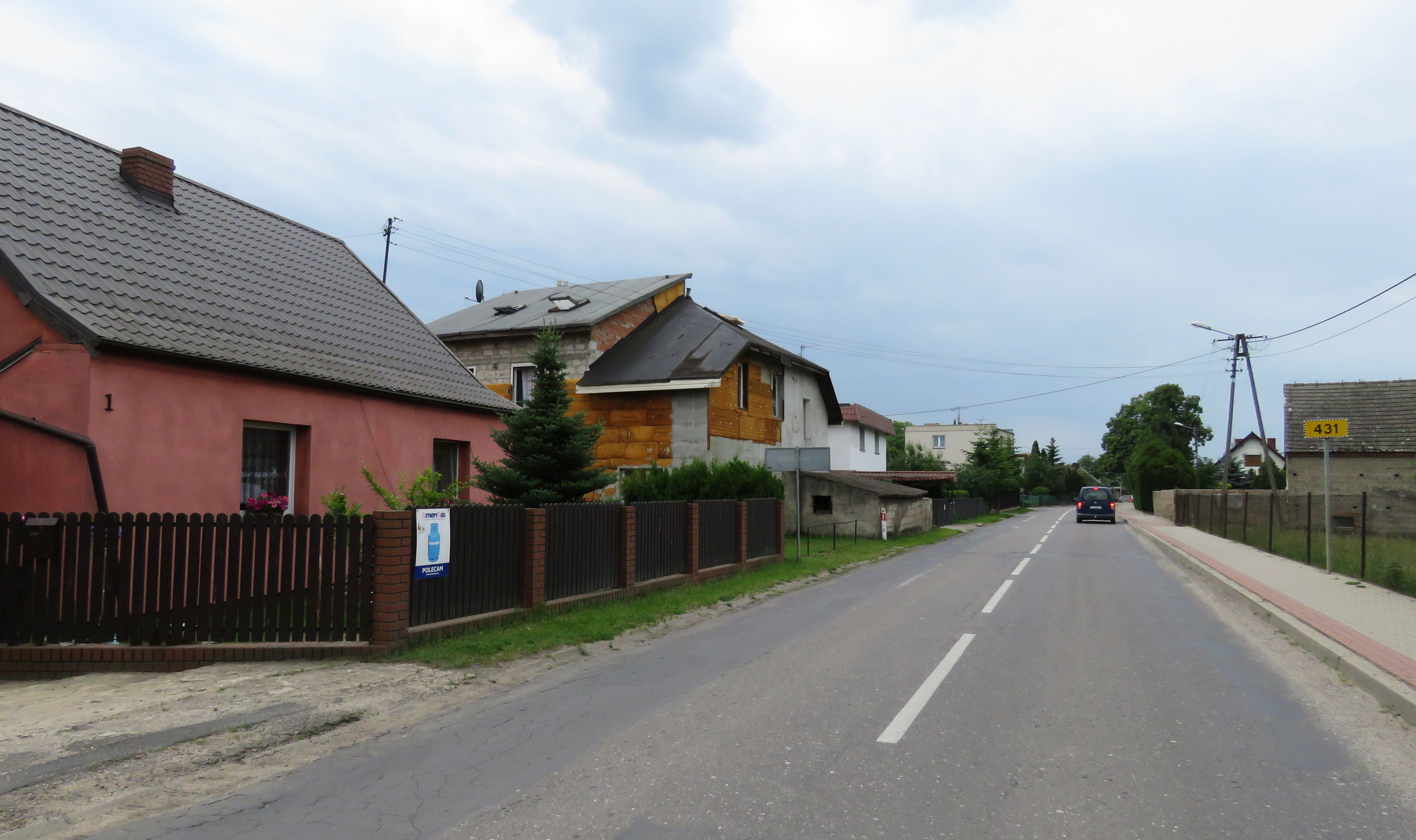

- Location within Poland
- Coordinates: 52°13′43″N 16°45′20″E
- Country: Poland
- Voivodeship: Greater Poland
- County: Poznań
- Gmina: Mosina

Nowe Dymaczewo [ˈnɔvɛ dɨmaˈt͡ʂɛvɔ] is a village in the administrative district of Gmina Mosina, within Poznań County, Greater Poland Voivodeship, in west-central Poland.
