= Rembelszczyzna =

- Village
- Location within Poland
- Coordinates: 52°22′43″N 21°1′45″E
- Country: Poland
- Voivodeship: Masovian
- County: Legionowo
- Gmina: Nieporęt
- Population: 483

Rembelszczyzna [rɛmbɛlʂˈt͡ʂɨzna] is a village in the administrative district of Gmina Nieporęt, within Legionowo County, Masovian Voivodeship, in east-central Poland.

As of 29 October 2008, the parish had 235 hectares of land and 483 inhabitants.

== History ==
- The village is described as part of the parish of Tarchomin of 1785.
- In the 1830s relay stations for an optical telegraph line from Warsaw to Moscow via St Petersburg were built in the village - neighboring stations were located in Bialoleka and Zegrz.
- In 1827, Rembelszczyzna had 131 inhabitants and 11 houses. In 1880, the population had risen to 160.
