= Kamień, Gmina Łaziska =

Kamień
- Village
- Location within Poland
- Coordinates: 51°8′N 21°49′E
- Country: Poland
- Voivodeship: Lublin
- County: Opole
- Gmina: Łaziska
- Population: 394

Kamień (Polish pronunciation: [ˈkamjɛj̃]) is a village in the administrative district of Gmina Łaziska, within Opole County, Lublin Voivodeship, in eastern Poland.
