= Bożeń =

- Village
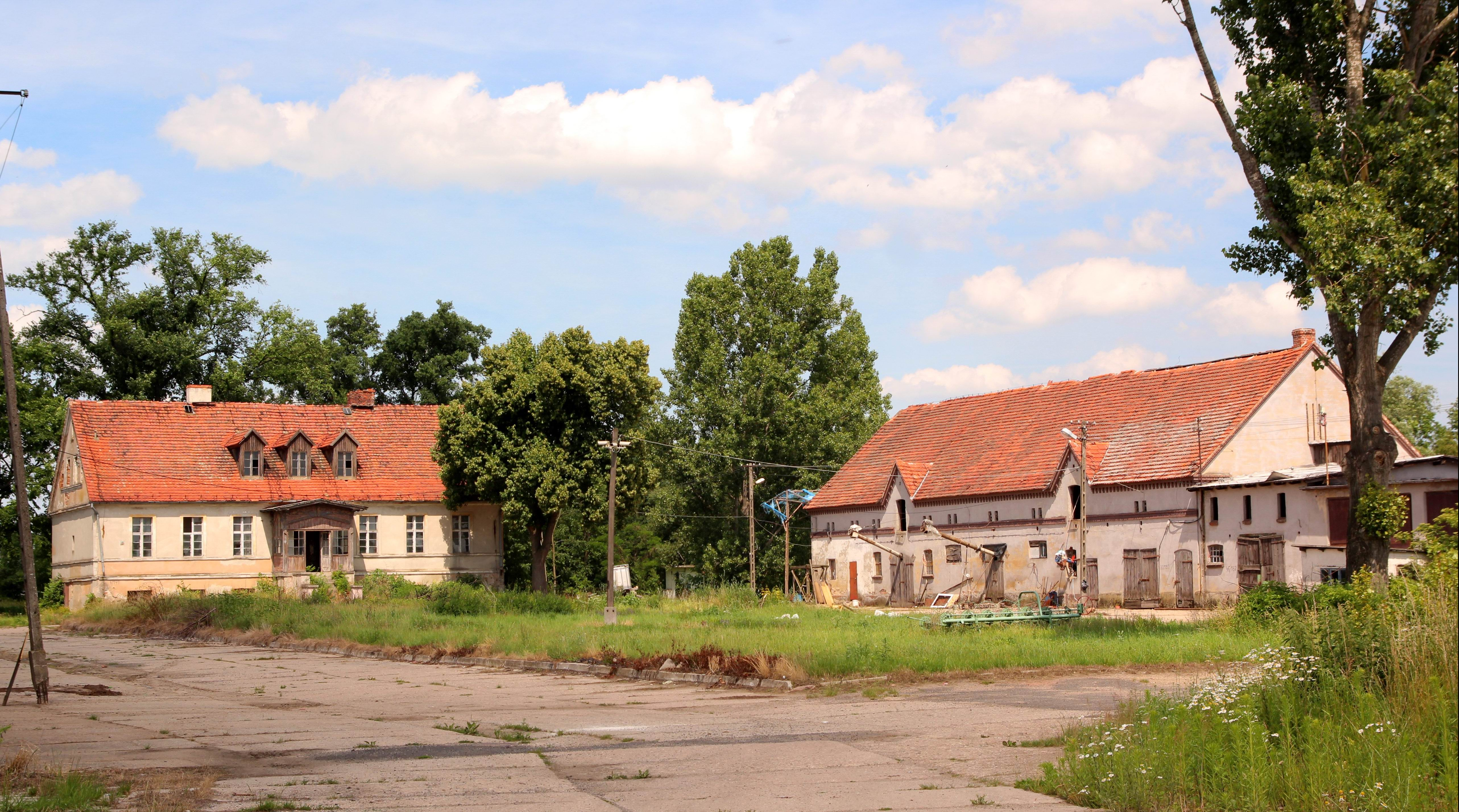

- Location within Poland
- Coordinates: 51°23′N 16°38′E
- Country: Poland
- Voivodeship: Lower Silesian
- County: Wołów
- Gmina: Wołów
- Population (approx.): 500

Bożeń [ˈbɔʐɛɲ] is a village in the administrative district of Gmina Wołów, within Wołów County, Lower Silesian Voivodeship, in south-western Poland.

The first mention of the village lies in the bronze age, in the years 900-700 B.C. During the 14th century Bożeń came under Bohemian King John of Luxembourg. Later the place was returned to Poland. Germany used to call place Buschen, but in 1483 documents mention it as Boschenn.

There was a mill in the village and residents' free time was spent in an inn. In 1841 an Evangelical school was organised in the village and teachers were recruited. Around 1910 a new school building was built. In 1889, road construction was completed that joined it to Wińsko. In 1925, the population was 236 persons, with 222 Evangelicals and 14 Catholics. In 1939 the population was 210.

After World War II, the village was named Bożeń. In the communist period, farms were established that specialised in cattle. That contributed considerably to rural development and 18 apartment blocks were built for persons employed in the agricultural establishment. After 1995, the plant was leased to a private firm dealing with milk and plant production.

During the years 1975-1998 the place administratively belonged to the Wroclaw Voivodeship.

In the village is the church of St. Mary belonging to the parish in Moczydlnicy. Since 2005, there have been annual festivities organized by the Culture Centre.

The village has an approximate population of 500.
