= Rączki, Warmian-Masurian Voivodeship =

Rączki
- Village
- Location within Poland
- Coordinates: 53°24′30″N 20°19′56″E
- Country: Poland
- Voivodeship: Warmian-Masurian
- County: Nidzica
- Gmina: Nidzica
- Population: 240

Rączki [ˈrɔnt͡ʂki] is a village in the administrative district of Gmina Nidzica, within Nidzica County, Warmian-Masurian Voivodeship, in northern Poland.
