= Nowe Bielice, Greater Poland Voivodeship =

Nowe Bielice
- Village
- Location within Poland
- Coordinates: 52°52′1″N 15°58′56″E
- Country: Poland
- Voivodeship: Greater Poland
- County: Czarnków-Trzcianka
- Gmina: Krzyż Wielkopolski

Nowe Bielice ([ˈnɔvɛ bjɛˈlit͡sɛ]; German: Neu Beelitz) is a village in the administrative district of Gmina Krzyż Wielkopolski, within Czarnków-Trzcianka County, Greater Poland Voivodeship, in west-central Poland.
