= Podlesiec =

- Village
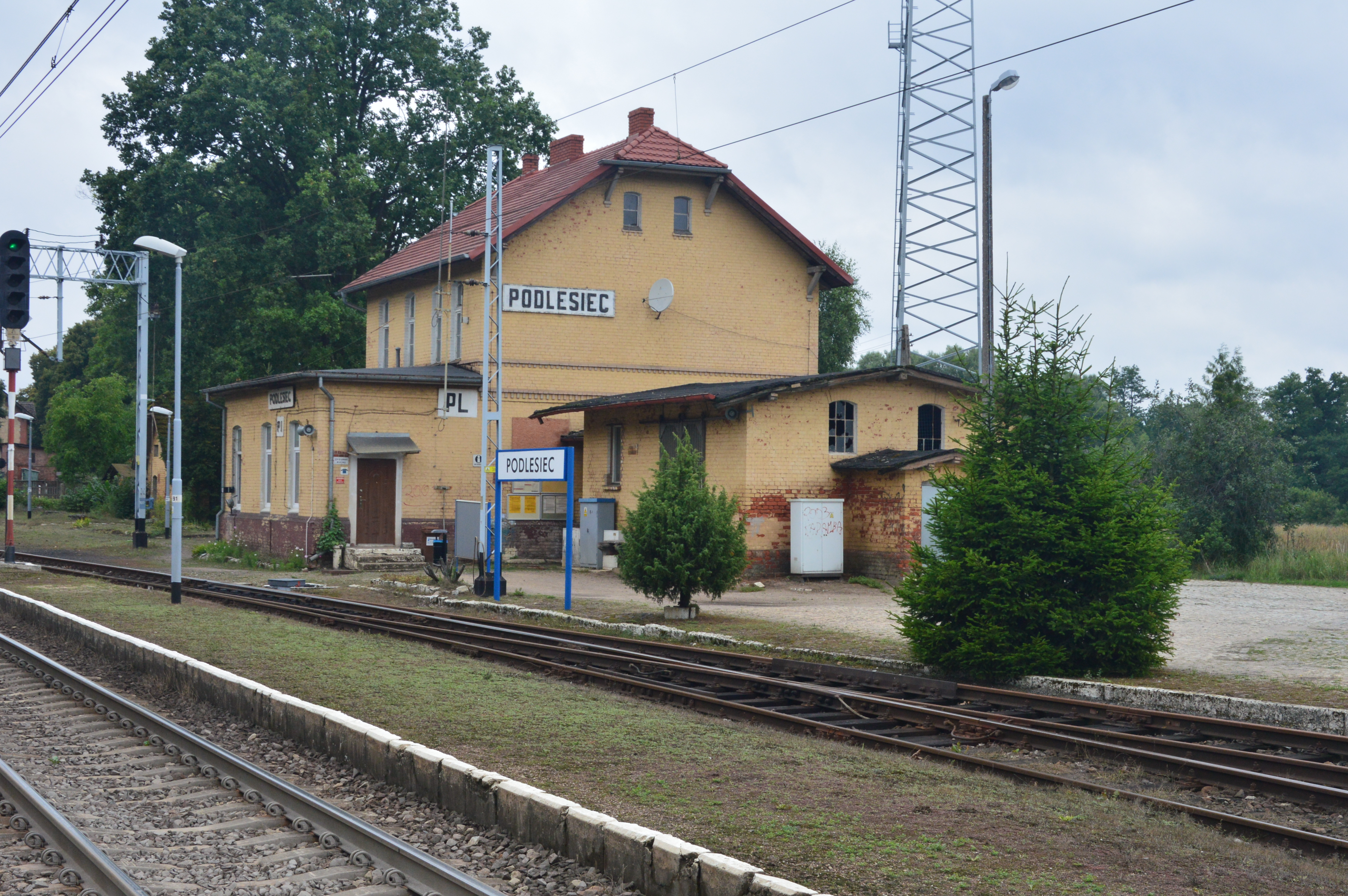
- Railway station

- Location within Poland
- Coordinates: 52°56′20″N 15°52′30″E
- Country: Poland
- Voivodeship: Lubusz
- County: Strzelce-Drezdenko
- Gmina: Dobiegniew

Podlesiec [pɔdˈlɛɕɛt͡s] is a village in the administrative district of Gmina Dobiegniew, within Strzelce-Drezdenko County, Lubusz Voivodeship, in western Poland.
