= Okrągła Łąka =

- Village
- Location within Poland
- Coordinates: 53°37′6″N 18°48′23″E
- Country: Poland
- Voivodeship: Pomeranian
- County: Kwidzyn
- Gmina: Sadlinki
- Population (2022): 373

Okrągła Łąka [ɔˈkrɔnɡwa ˈwɔnka] is a village in the administrative district of Gmina Sadlinki, within Kwidzyn County, Pomeranian Voivodeship, in northern Poland.

For the history of the region, see History of Pomerania.
