= Różanówka =

- Village
- Location within Poland
- Coordinates: 51°46′N 15°52′E
- Country: Poland
- Voivodeship: Lubusz
- County: Nowa Sól
- Gmina: Siedlisko

Różanówka [ruʐaˈnufka] is a village in the administrative district of Gmina Siedlisko, within Nowa Sól County, Lubusz Voivodeship, in western Poland.
