= Liszkowo, Kuyavian-Pomeranian Voivodeship =

Liszkowo
- Village
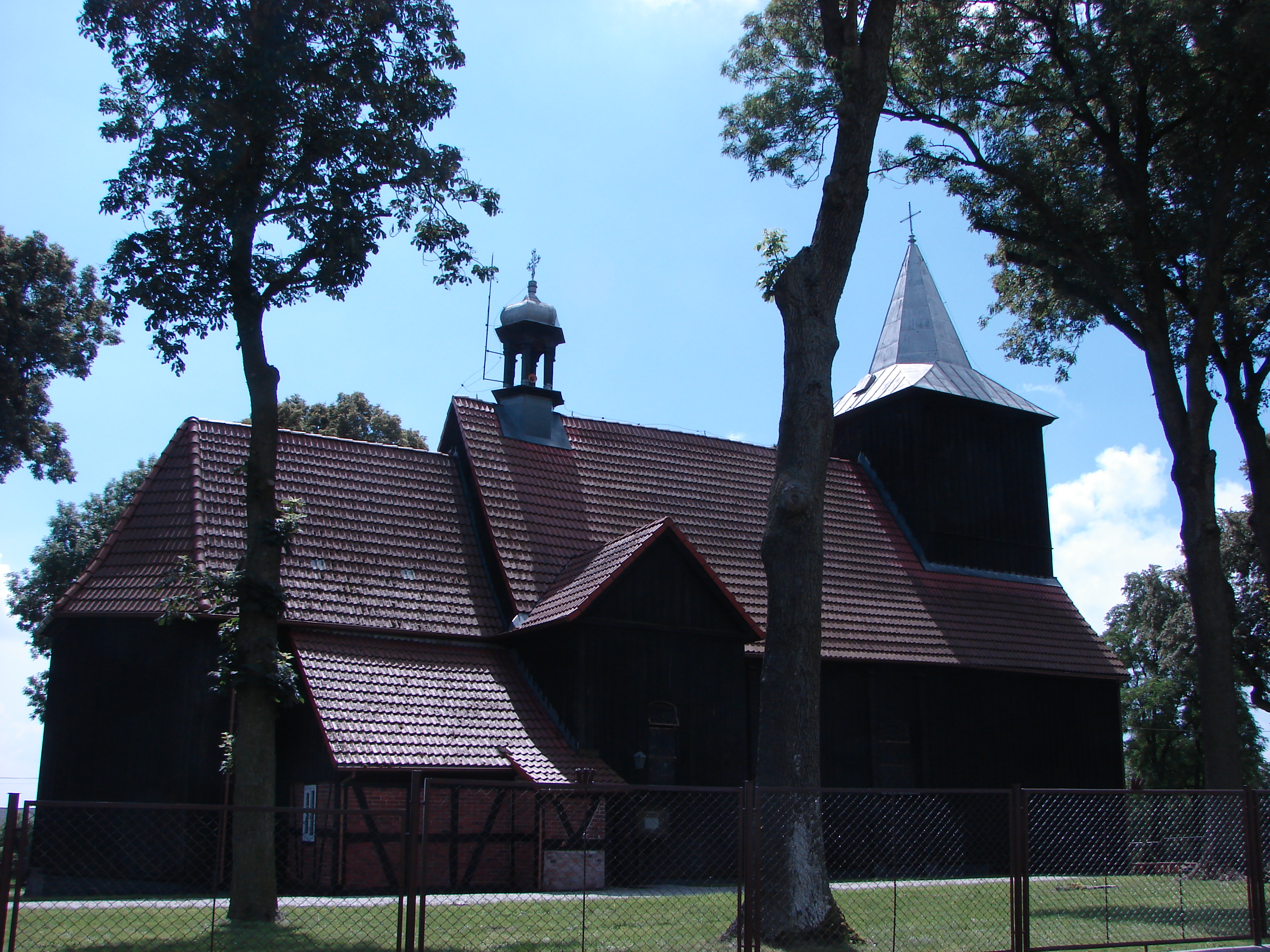
- St. Ann's wooden church from the early 18th century.

- Location within Poland
- Coordinates: 52°53′35″N 18°12′58″E
- Country: Poland
- Voivodeship: Kuyavian-Pomeranian
- County: Inowrocław
- Gmina: Rojewo

Liszkowo [liʂˈkɔvɔ] (German: Lischkowo) is a village in the administrative district of Gmina Rojewo, within Inowrocław County, Kuyavian-Pomeranian Voivodeship, in north-central Poland.
