= Wybcz =

- Village
- Location within Poland
- Coordinates: 53°10′51″N 18°27′33″E
- Country: Poland
- Voivodeship: Kuyavian-Pomeranian
- County: Toruń
- Gmina: Łubianka
- Population: 450

Wybcz [vɨpt͡ʂ] is a village in the administrative district of Gmina Łubianka, within Toruń County, Kuyavian-Pomeranian Voivodeship, in north-central Poland.
