= Gurcz =

- Village
- Location within Poland
- Coordinates: 53°49′12″N 18°54′22″E
- Country: Poland
- Voivodeship: Pomeranian
- County: Kwidzyn
- Gmina: Kwidzyn
- Population: 380

Gurcz [ɡurt͡ʂ] is a village in the administrative district of Gmina Kwidzyn, within Kwidzyn County, Pomeranian Voivodeship, in northern Poland.

For the history of the region, see History of Pomerania.
