= Pogrodzie =

- Village
- Location within Poland
- Coordinates: 54°17′22″N 19°35′59″E
- Country: Poland
- Voivodeship: Warmian-Masurian
- County: Elbląg
- Gmina: Tolkmicko
- Population: 660
- Website: www.pogrodzie.pl

Pogrodzie [pɔˈɡrɔd͡ʑɛ] is a village in the administrative district of Gmina Tolkmicko, within Elbląg County, Warmian-Masurian Voivodeship, in northern Poland.
