= Muszkowo =

- Village
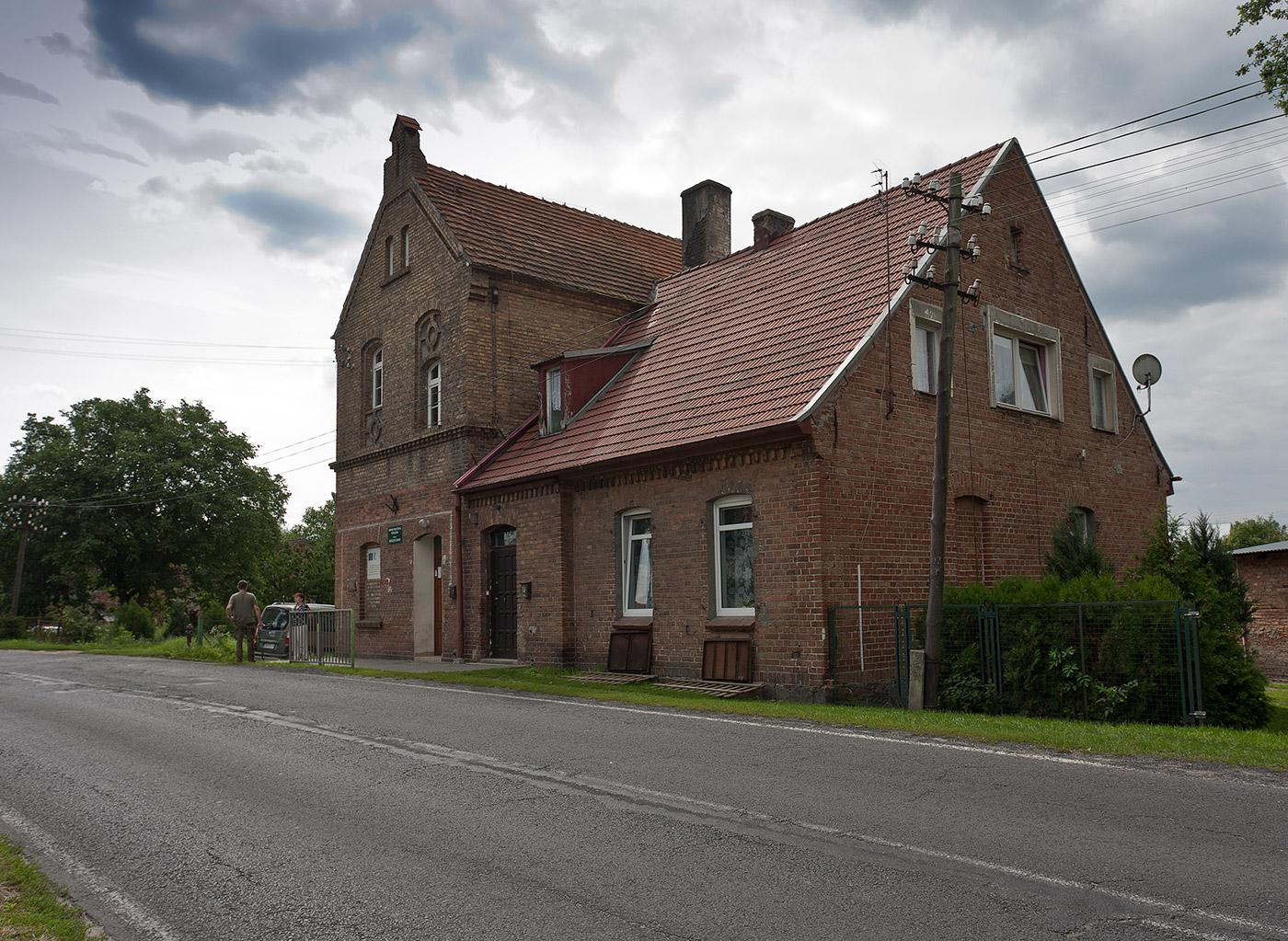

- Location within Poland
- Coordinates: 52°32′N 14°58′E
- Country: Poland
- Voivodeship: Lubusz
- County: Sulęcin
- Gmina: Krzeszyce
- Population: 260

Muszkowo [muʂˈkɔvɔ] is a village in the administrative district of Gmina Krzeszyce, within Sulęcin County, Lubusz Voivodeship, in western Poland.
