= Łobodno =

- Village
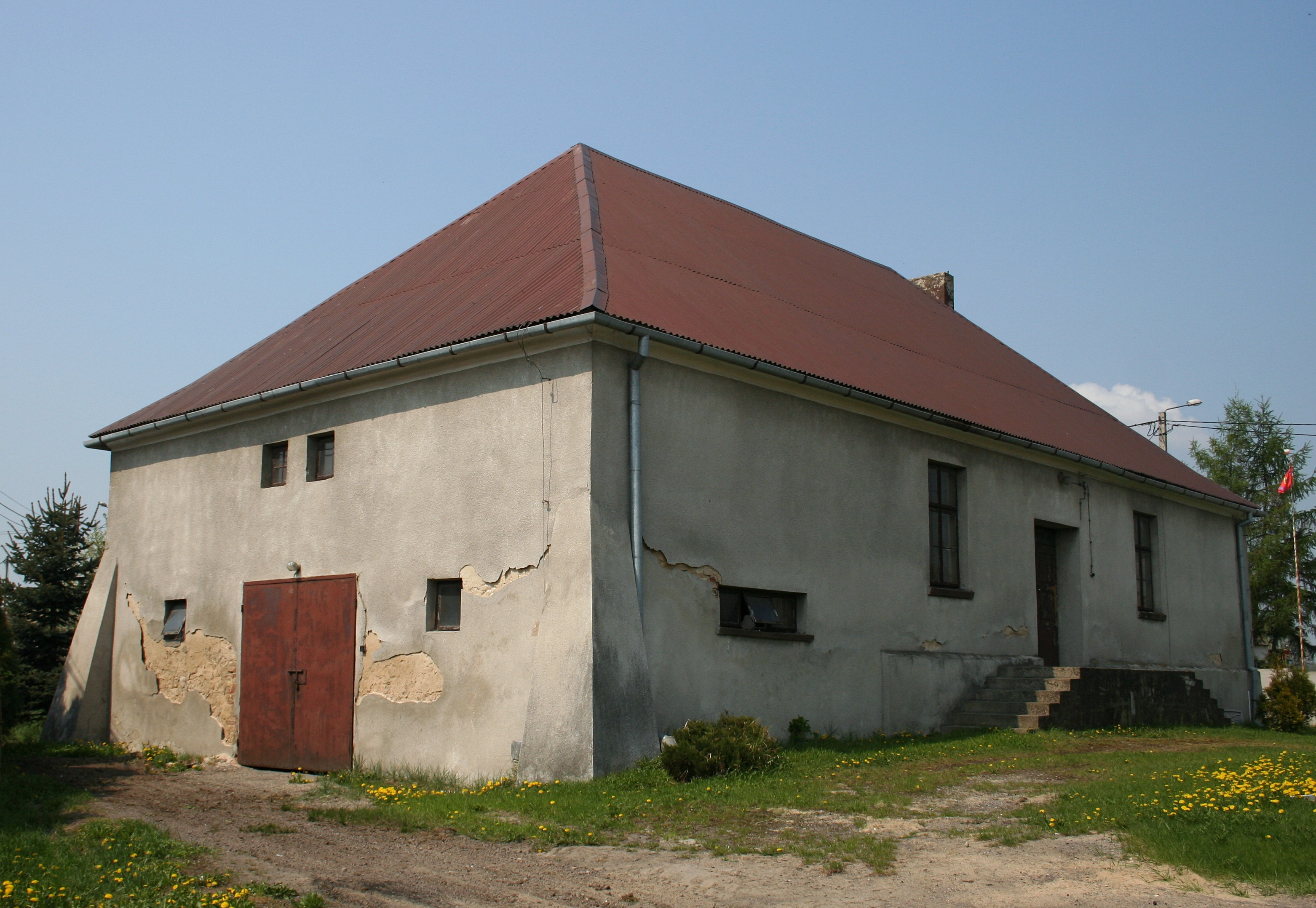

- Location within Poland
- Coordinates: 50°55′N 18°59′E
- Country: Poland
- Voivodeship: Silesian
- County: Kłobuck
- Gmina: Kłobuck
- Population: 1,792

Łobodno [wɔˈbɔdnɔ] is a village in the administrative district of Gmina Kłobuck, within Kłobuck County, Silesian Voivodeship, in southern Poland.
