= Sikórz, Kuyavian-Pomeranian Voivodeship =

Sikórz
- Village
- Location within Poland
- Coordinates: 52°57′20″N 19°11′01″E
- Country: Poland
- Voivodeship: Kuyavian-Pomeranian
- County: Lipno
- Gmina: Chrostkowo

Sikórz [ˈɕikuʂ] is a village in the administrative district of Gmina Chrostkowo, within Lipno County, Kuyavian-Pomeranian Voivodeship, in north-central Poland.
