= Kopanie, Opole Voivodeship =

Village in Opole Voivodeship, Poland

Kopanie
- Village
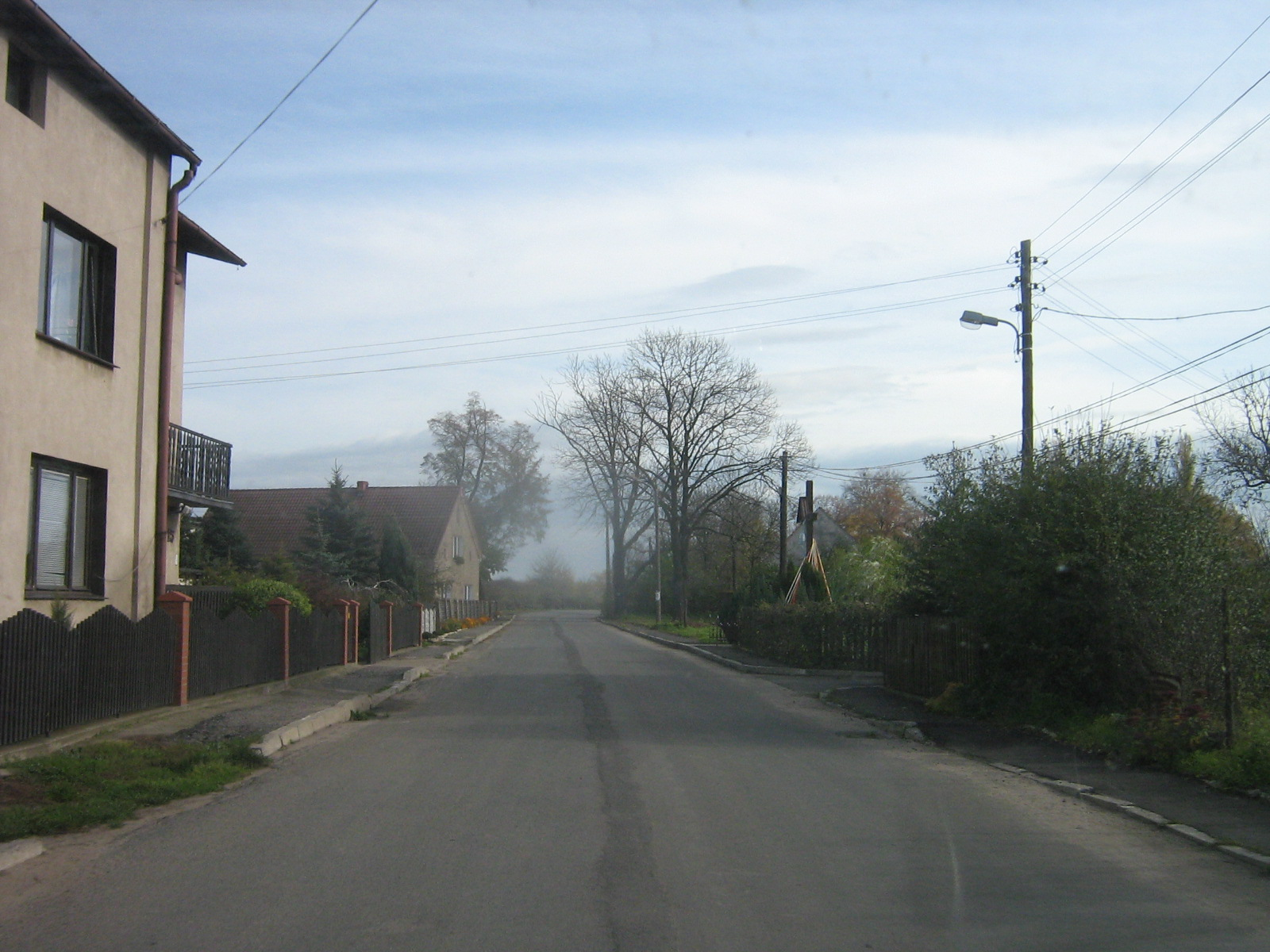

- Location within Poland
- Coordinates: 50°49′N 17°37′E
- Country: Poland
- Voivodeship: Opole
- County: Brzeg
- Gmina: Skarbimierz
- Population: 100

Kopanie [kɔˈpaɲɛ] is a village in the administrative district of Gmina Skarbimierz, within Brzeg County, Opole Voivodeship, in south-western Poland.
