= Kosin, Lublin Voivodeship =

Kosin
- Village
- Location within Poland
- Coordinates: 50°49′9″N 21°54′47″E
- Country: Poland
- Voivodeship: Lublin
- County: Kraśnik
- Gmina: Annopol

Population
  - Total: 680

Kosin [ˈkɔɕin] is a village in the administrative district of Gmina Annopol, within Kraśnik County, Lublin Voivodeship, in eastern Poland.
