= Kurowice, Łódź Voivodeship =

Kurowice
- Village
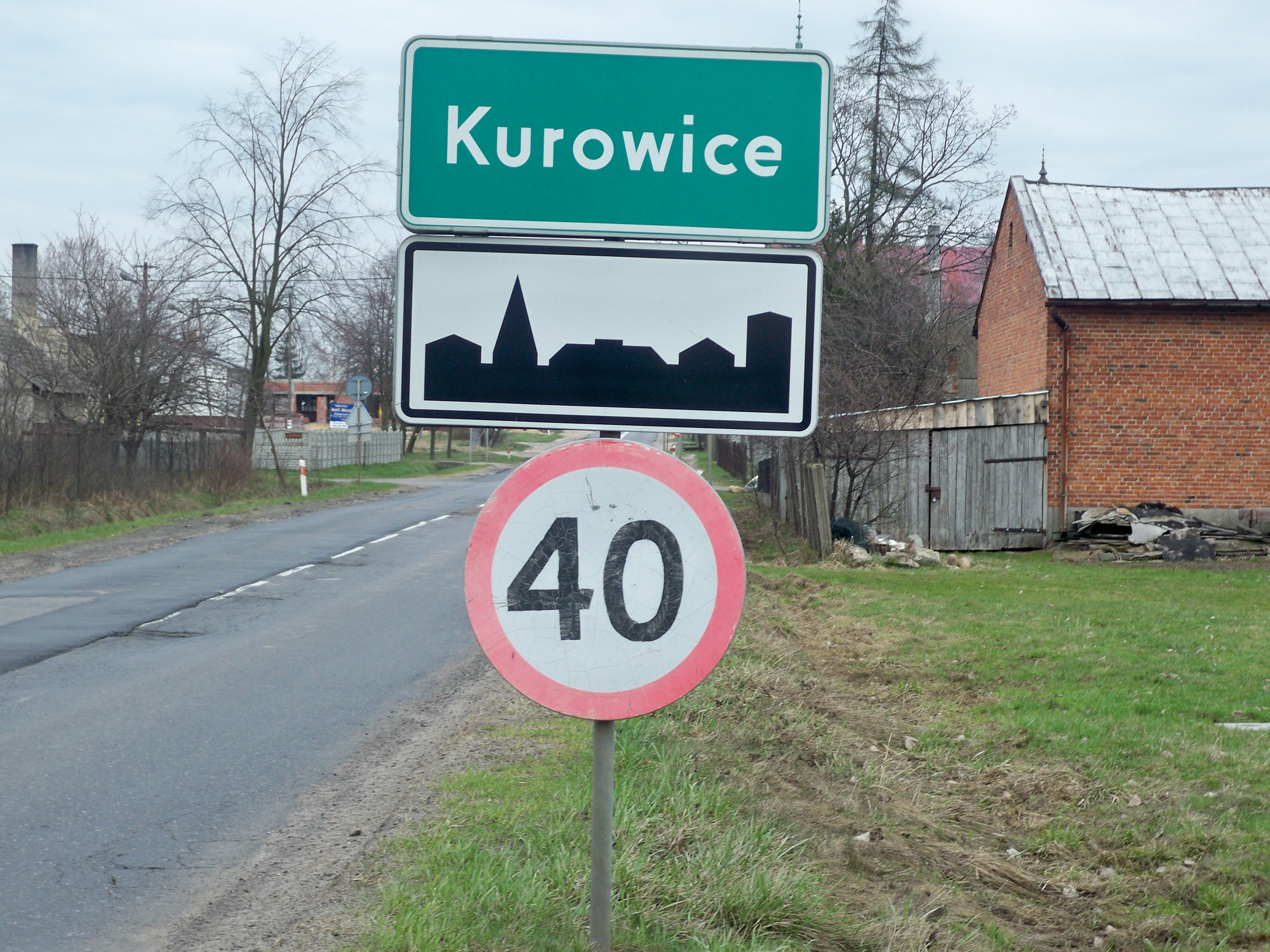

- Location within Poland
- Coordinates: 51°39′55″N 19°41′9″E
- Country: Poland
- Voivodeship: Łódź
- County: Łódź East
- Gmina: Brójce
- Population: 950

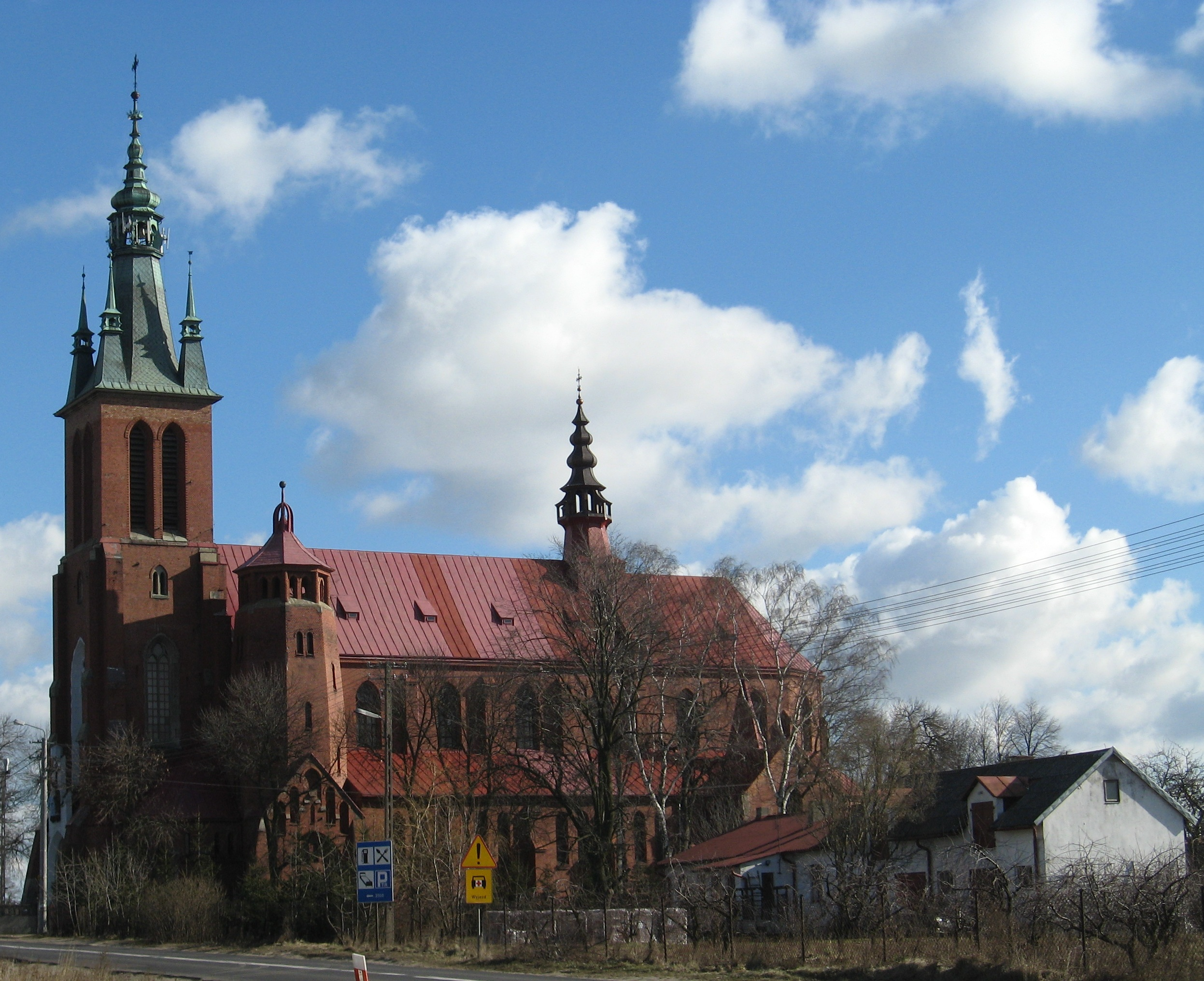
Church in Kurowice

Kurowice [kurɔˈvit͡sɛ] is a village in the administrative district of Gmina Brójce, within Łódź East County, Łódź Voivodeship, in central Poland.
