= Zielona, Bochnia County =

Zielona
- Village
- Location within Poland
- Coordinates: 50°7′N 20°27′E
- Country: Poland
- Voivodeship: Lesser Poland
- County: Bochnia
- Gmina: Drwinia

Zielona (Polish pronunciation: [ʑɛˈlɔna]) is a village in the administrative district of Gmina Drwinia, within Bochnia County, Lesser Poland Voivodeship, in southern Poland.
