= Chojno, Szamotuły County =

Chojno
- Village
- Location within Poland
- Coordinates: 52°42′0″N 16°12′44″E
- Country: Poland
- Voivodeship: Greater Poland
- County: Szamotuły
- Gmina: Wronki
- Population: 310
- Website: http://www.chojno.pl

Chojno (Polish pronunciation: [ˈxɔjnɔ]) is a village in the administrative district of Gmina Wronki, within Szamotuły County, Greater Poland Voivodeship, in west-central Poland.
