= Budy, Białystok County =

Budy
- Village
- Location within Poland
- Coordinates: 52°56′N 23°50′E
- Country: Poland
- Voivodeship: Podlaskie
- County: Białystok
- Gmina: Michałowo

Budy [ˈbudɨ] is a village in the administrative district of Gmina Michałowo, within Białystok County, Podlaskie Voivodeship, in north-eastern Poland, close to the border with Belarus.

== History ==
The village was founded in the 18th century by the Budniki family who cut down the forest and obtained raw materials from it. At that time, at the request of the manor in Jałówka, ashes were burned on its premises. This fact is confirmed by the fact that later inhabitants of Budy, who dug wells and other pits (such as mounds for storing potatoes), often found traces of extensive old hearths. According to data from the 1921 Polish census, 192 people lived in Budy (of which 89 were men and 103 women).

Because the location of a water reservoir in these areas was planned already in the early 1960s, the construction of new facilities was prohibited and it was one of the last villages in this area that was not electrified until the very end. In the years 1979–1982, most farmers sold their farms and buildings to the state and moved from Budy to Białystok and Hajnówka. And some families were relocated, including to Michałowo and Bondary, where new housing estates were built for them. Five farms survived from the original village, located north of the Siemianówka Reservoir. Summer houses which are inhabited seasonally are located in the areas near the reservoir.
