= Atanazy Nos =

Bishop of the Polish Orthodox Church

Atanazy (Nos)
- Bishop of Łódź and Poznań
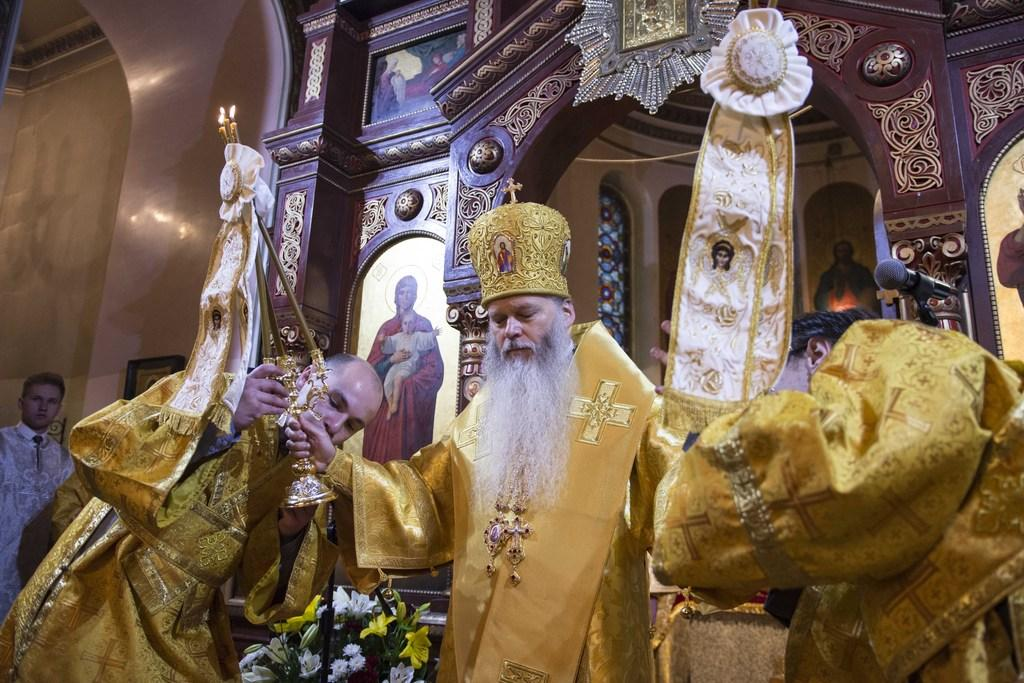
- Church: Polish Orthodox Church
- Elected: 2017
- Predecessor: Szymon

Orders
- Ordination: 1996
- Consecration: 2017

Personal details
- Born: November 27, 1968 Stara Łuplanka

Bishop Atanazy, (secular birth name Mirosław Nos; born 27 November 1968 in Stara Łuplanka) is the Bishop of Łódź and Poznań.

== Biography ==
He is a graduate from the agricultural technical school in Michałowo. Then he studied at the Orthodox Theological Seminary in Warsaw. In 1991 he was sent to study theology at the Institute of St. Tikhon Zadonski at the monastery of the same name in South Canaan, graduating in 1995 with a master's degree.

In 1996 he joined the monastery of St. Onuphrius in Jabłeczna. In the same year he was ordinated deacon. A few months later, in August 1996, he was haircut as a monk, taking the religious name of Atanazy (Athanasius) in honor of the holy monk, marty Atanazy Brzeski. On 1 September 1996, Abel (Popławski), the bishop of Lublin and Chełm, ordained him a hieromonk.

Between 1997 and 1999 he stayed in Athens, on a scholarship. After his return, on 4 May 1999, he was appointed the confessor and dean of the monastic community in Jabłeczna. On 15 January 2007, he became its governor and pastor of the monastery parish.

On 24 August 2017, the Holy Council of Bishops of the Polish Autocephalous Orthodox Church elected him the Bishop of the Łódź-Poznań diocese. Chirotonia took place on 24 September 2017 in the Metropolitan Council of St. Mary Magdalene in Warsaw under the leadership of the Metropolitan of Warsaw and all of Poland Sawa.

Eastern Orthodox Church titles
Preceded by Szymon (Romańczuk)	Bishop of Łódź and Poznań; 2017–present	Incumbent
