= Nowosady =

Nowosady may refer to the following places:

- Nowosady, Gmina Michałowo in Podlaskie Voivodeship (north-east Poland)
- Nowosady, Gmina Zabłudów in Podlaskie Voivodeship (north-east Poland)
- Nowosady, Bielsk County in Podlaskie Voivodeship (north-east Poland)
- Nowosady, Hajnówka County in Podlaskie Voivodeship (north-east Poland)
- Nowosady, Sejny County in Podlaskie Voivodeship (north-east Poland)
- Nowosady, Warmian-Masurian Voivodeship (north Poland)
- Nowosady, Polish name for Navasady, Grodno District (west Belarus)
