= Kamienny Bród =

- Village
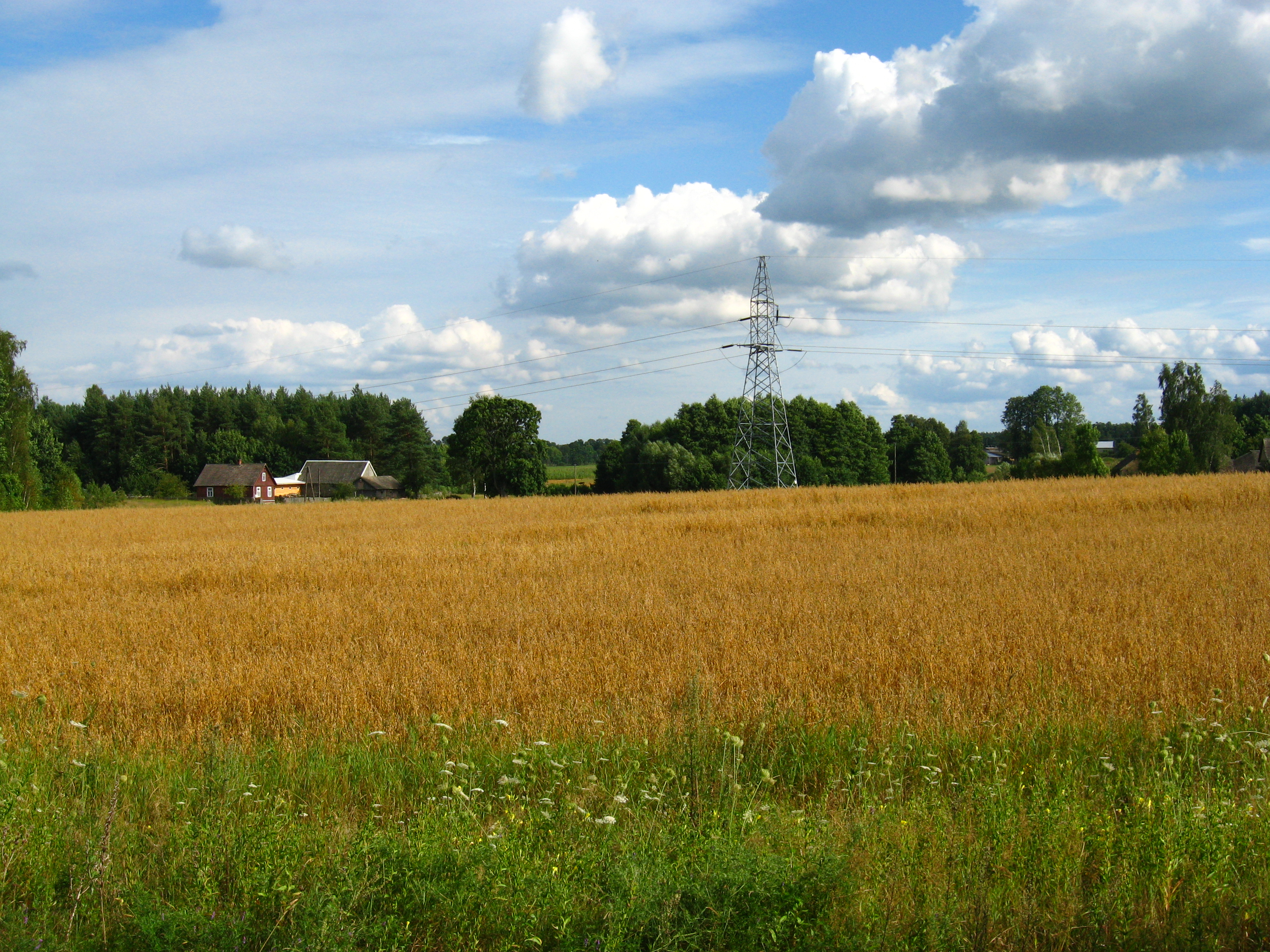
- Kamienny Bród, Gmina Michałowo — view from the road from/to Michałowo; behind trees: Kazimierowo village

- Location within Poland
- Coordinates: 53°01′41″N 23°34′51″E
- Country: Poland
- Voivodeship: Podlaskie
- County: Białystok
- Gmina: Michałowo

Kamienny Bród [kaˈmjɛnnɨ ˈbrut] is a village in the administrative district of Gmina Michałowo, within Białystok County, Podlaskie Voivodeship, in north-eastern Poland, near the border with Belarus.
