= Dublany =

Dublany may refer to:

- Dublany, Podlaskie Voivodeship, a village in Podlaskie Voivodeship in Poland
- Dubliany, a town in Lviv Oblast in Ukraine
