= Borsukowizna =

Borsukowizna refers to the following places in Poland:

- Borsukowizna, Białystok County
- Borsukowizna, Sokółka County
