= Planty =

Planty may refer to:

- Planty Park, a city park in Kraków, Poland
- Planty, Podlaskie Voivodeship (north-east Poland)
- Planty, Aube, France
