= Tylwica-Majątek =

- Village
- Location within Poland
- Coordinates: 53°2′N 23°28′E
- Country: Poland
- Voivodeship: Podlaskie
- County: Białystok
- Gmina: Michałowo

Tylwica-Majątek [tɨlˈvit͡sa maˈjɔntɛk] is a village in the administrative district of Gmina Michałowo, within Białystok County, Podlaskie Voivodeship, in north-eastern Poland, close to the border with Belarus.
