= Krynica, Białystok County =

Krynica
- Village
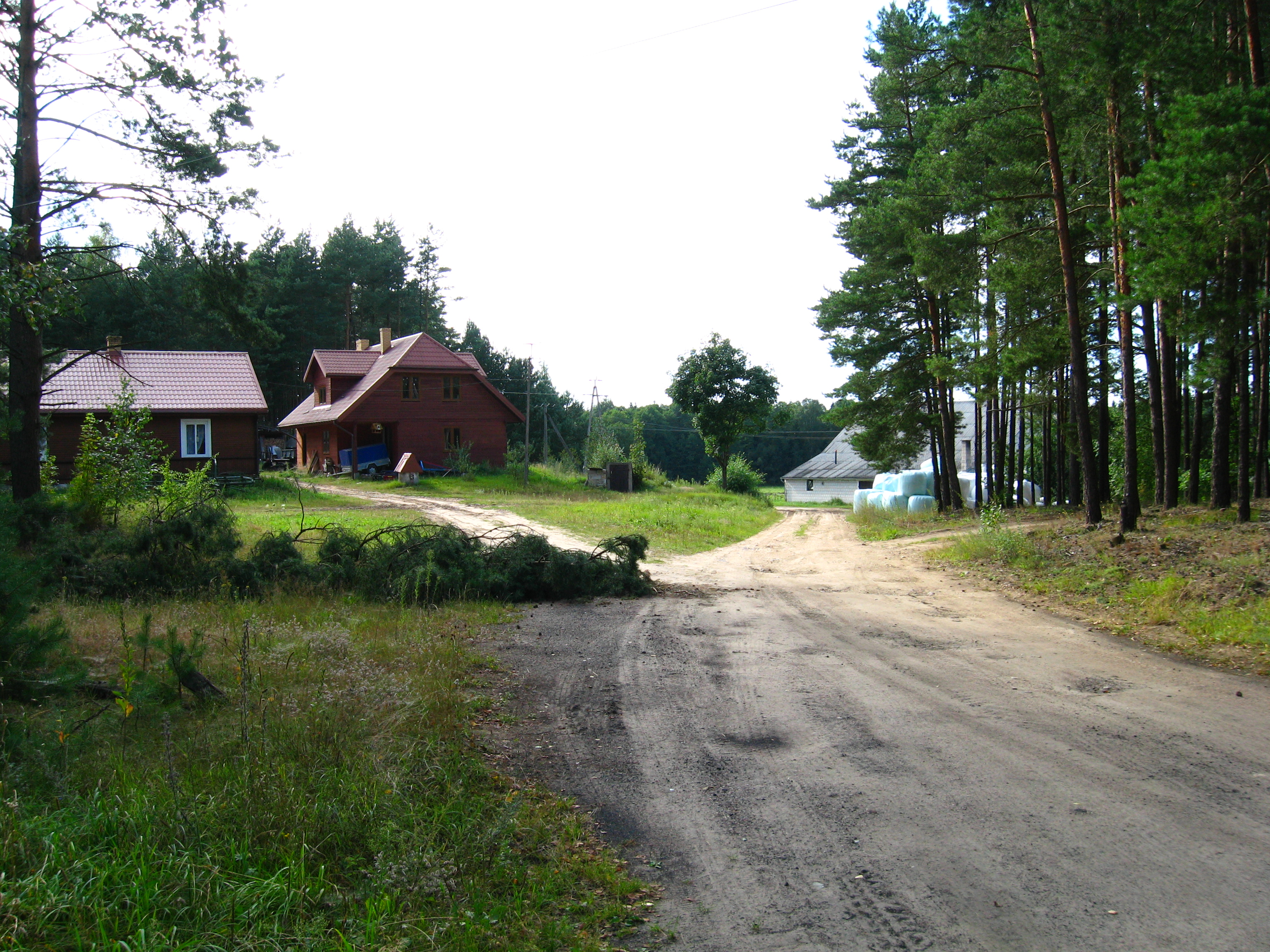
- Forest in Krynica

- Location within Poland
- Coordinates: 53°02′02″N 23°35′16″E
- Country: Poland
- Voivodeship: Podlaskie
- County: Białystok
- Gmina: Michałowo

Krynica [krɨˈnit͡sa] is a village in the administrative district of Gmina Michałowo, within Białystok County, Podlaskie Voivodeship, in north-eastern Poland, close to the border with Belarus.
