= Hieronimowo =

- Village
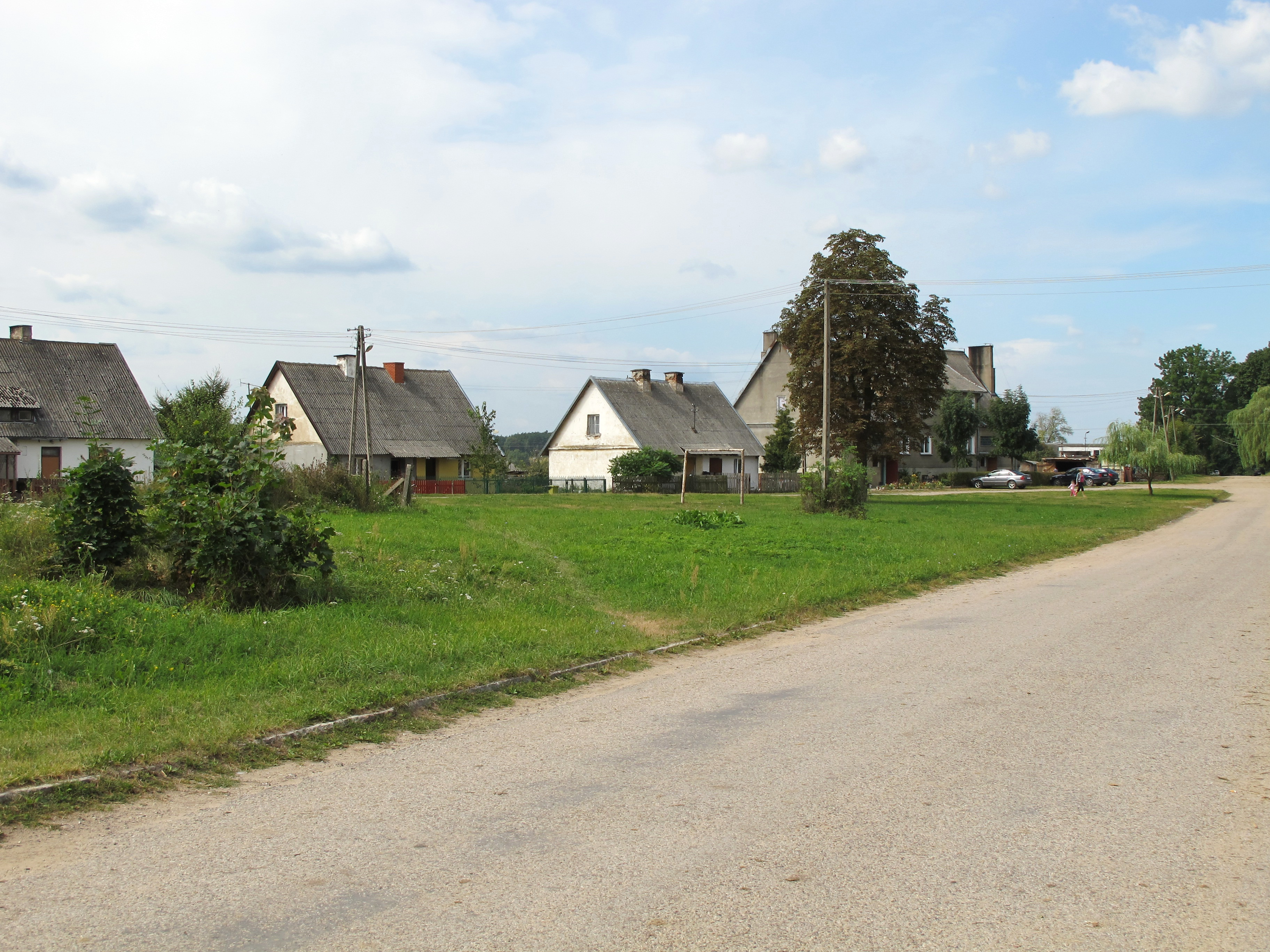
- Houses by an unpaved road in Hieronimowo

- Location within Poland
- Coordinates: 52°59′54″N 23°33′21″E
- Country: Poland
- Voivodeship: Podlaskie
- County: Białystok
- Gmina: Michałowo

Hieronimowo [xjɛrɔniˈmɔvɔ] is a village in the administrative district of Gmina Michałowo, within Białystok County, Podlaskie Voivodeship, in north-eastern Poland, close to the border with Belarus.
