= Żednia =

- Village
- Location within Poland
- Coordinates: 53°5′N 23°29′E
- Country: Poland
- Voivodeship: Podlaskie
- County: Białystok
- Gmina: Michałowo
- Population: 250

Żednia [ˈʐɛdɲa] is a village in the administrative district of Gmina Michałowo, within Białystok County, Podlaskie Voivodeship, in north-eastern Poland, close to the border with Belarus.
