= Lewsze =

- Village
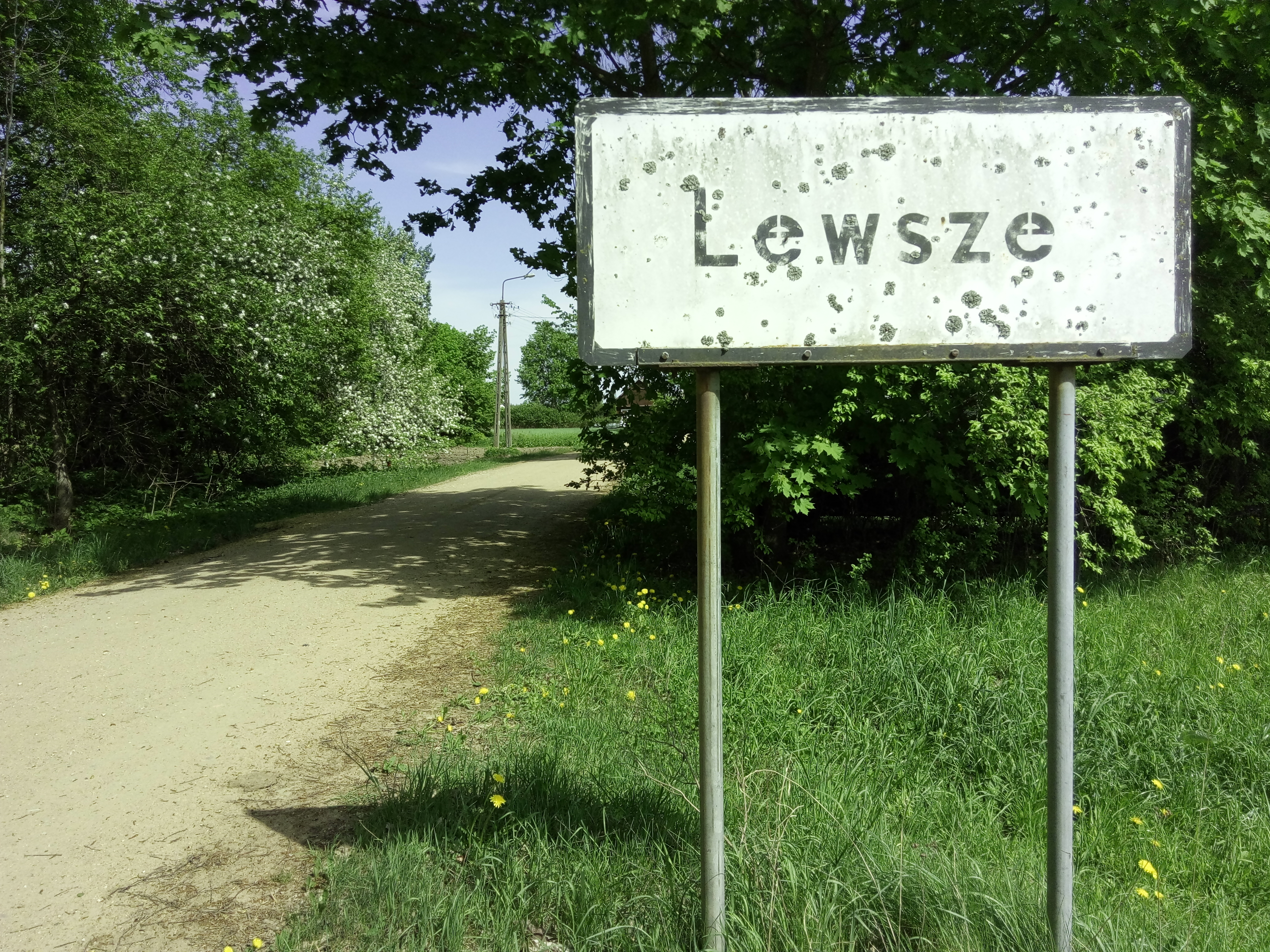
- Road sign in Lewsze

- Location within Poland
- Coordinates: 52°58′18″N 23°42′06″E
- Country: Poland
- Voivodeship: Podlaskie
- County: Białystok
- Gmina: Michałowo

Lewsze [ˈlɛfʂɛ] is a village in the administrative district of Gmina Michałowo, within Białystok County, Podlaskie Voivodeship, in northeastern Poland, near the border with Belarus.
