= Rochental =

- Village
- Location within Poland
- Coordinates: 53°3′N 23°39′E
- Country: Poland
- Voivodeship: Podlaskie
- County: Białystok
- Gmina: Michałowo

Rochental [rɔˈxɛntal] is a village in the administrative district of Gmina Michałowo, within Białystok County, Podlaskie Voivodeship, in north-eastern Poland, close to the border with Belarus.
