= Julianka, Podlaskie Voivodeship =

Julianka
- Settlement
- Location within Poland
- Coordinates: 52°58′07″N 23°30′57″E
- Country: Poland
- Voivodeship: Podlaskie
- County: Białystok
- Gmina: Michałowo

Julianka [juˈljanka] is a settlement in the administrative district of Gmina Michałowo, within Białystok County, Podlaskie Voivodeship, in north-eastern Poland, close to the border with Belarus.
