= Rybaki, Gmina Michałowo =

Rybaki
- Village
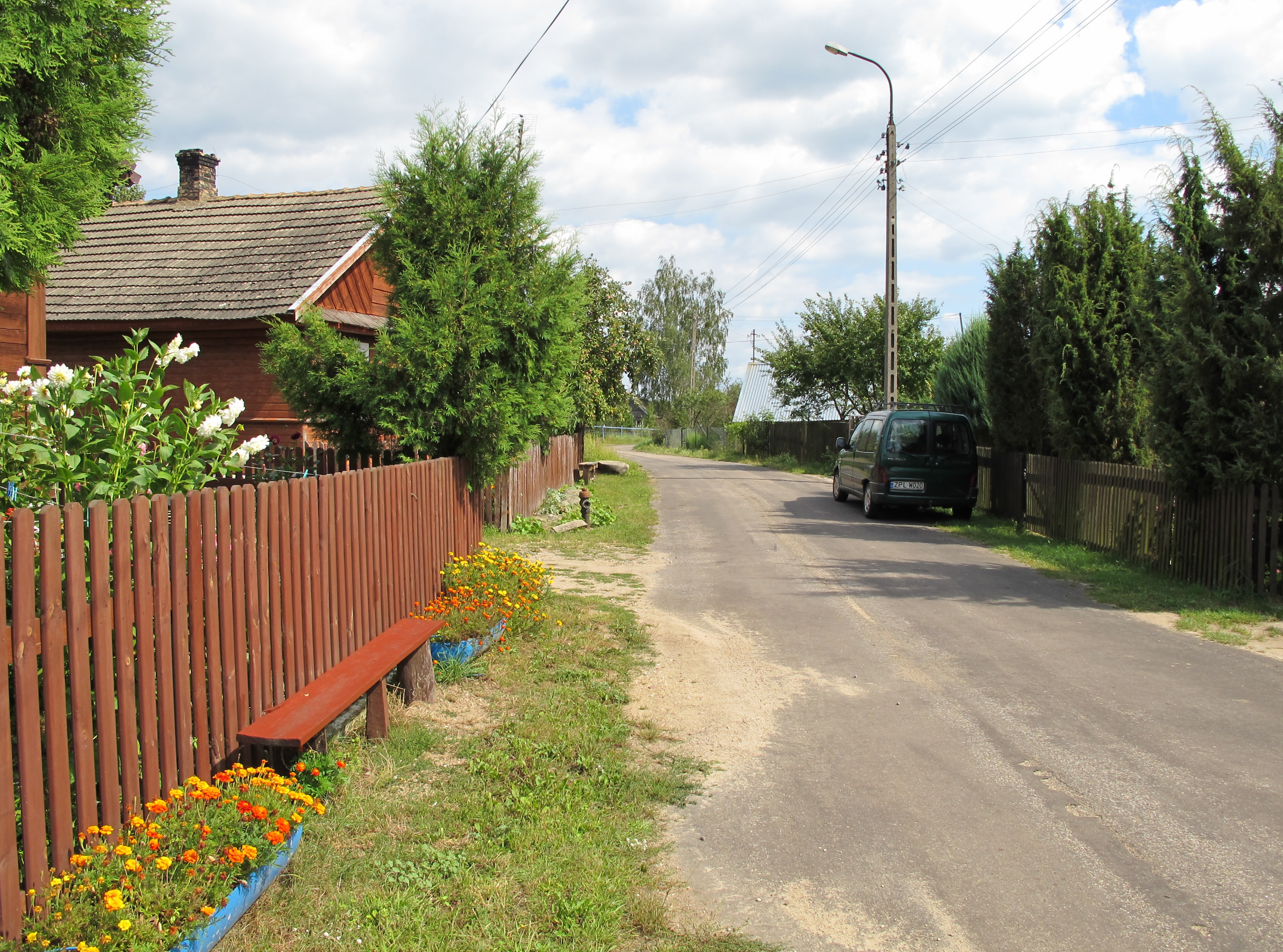
- Houses by the roadside in Rybaki

- Location within Poland
- Coordinates: 52°56′40″N 23°45′22″E
- Country: Poland
- Voivodeship: Podlaskie
- County: Białystok
- Gmina: Michałowo

Rybaki [rɨˈbaki] is a village in the administrative district of Gmina Michałowo, within Białystok County, Podlaskie Voivodeship, in north-eastern Poland, close to the border with Belarus.
