= Nowa Wola, Podlaskie Voivodeship =

Nowa Wola
- Village
- Location within Poland
- Coordinates: 53°0′N 23°38′E
- Country: Poland
- Voivodeship: Podlaskie
- County: Białystok
- Gmina: Michałowo

Nowa Wola [ˈnɔva ˈvɔla] is a village in the administrative district of Gmina Michałowo, within Białystok County, Podlaskie Voivodeship, in north-eastern Poland, close to the border with Belarus.
