= Szymki, Podlaskie Voivodeship =

Szymki
- Village
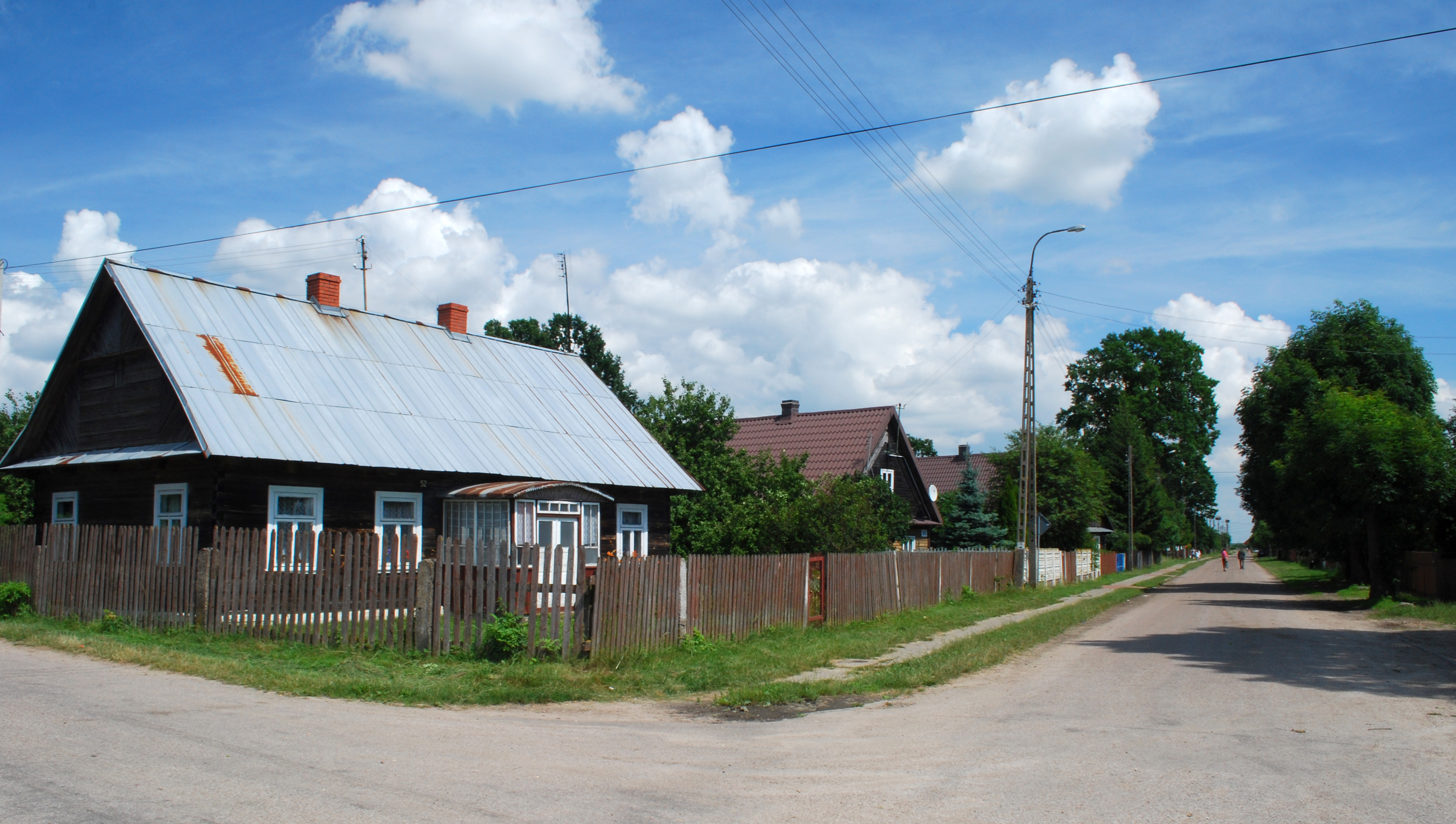
- Houses in Szymki

- Location within Poland
- Coordinates: 52°56′30″N 23°40′30″E
- Country: Poland
- Voivodeship: Podlaskie
- County: Białystok
- Gmina: Michałowo

Szymki (Polish pronunciation: [ˈʂɨmkʲi]) is a village in the administrative district of Gmina Michałowo, within Białystok County, Podlaskie Voivodeship, in north-eastern Poland, close to the border with Belarus.
