= Kuchmy-Kuce =

- Village
- Location within Poland
- Coordinates: 52°58′58″N 23°42′46″E
- Country: Poland
- Voivodeship: Podlaskie
- County: Białystok
- Gmina: Michałowo

Kuchmy-Kuce [ˈkuxmɨ ˈkut͡sɛ] is a village in the administrative district of Gmina Michałowo, within Białystok County, Podlaskie Voivodeship, in north-eastern Poland, close to the border with Belarus.
