= Kuryły, Białystok County =

Village in Gmina Michałowo, Poland

Kuryły
- Village
- Location within Poland
- Coordinates: 52°58′38″N 23°42′26″E
- Country: Poland
- Voivodeship: Podlaskie
- County: Białystok
- Gmina: Michałowo

Kuryły [kuˈrɨwɨ] is a village in the administrative district of Gmina Michałowo, within Białystok County, Podlaskie Voivodeship, in north-eastern Poland, close to the border with Belarus.
