= Gonczary =

- Village
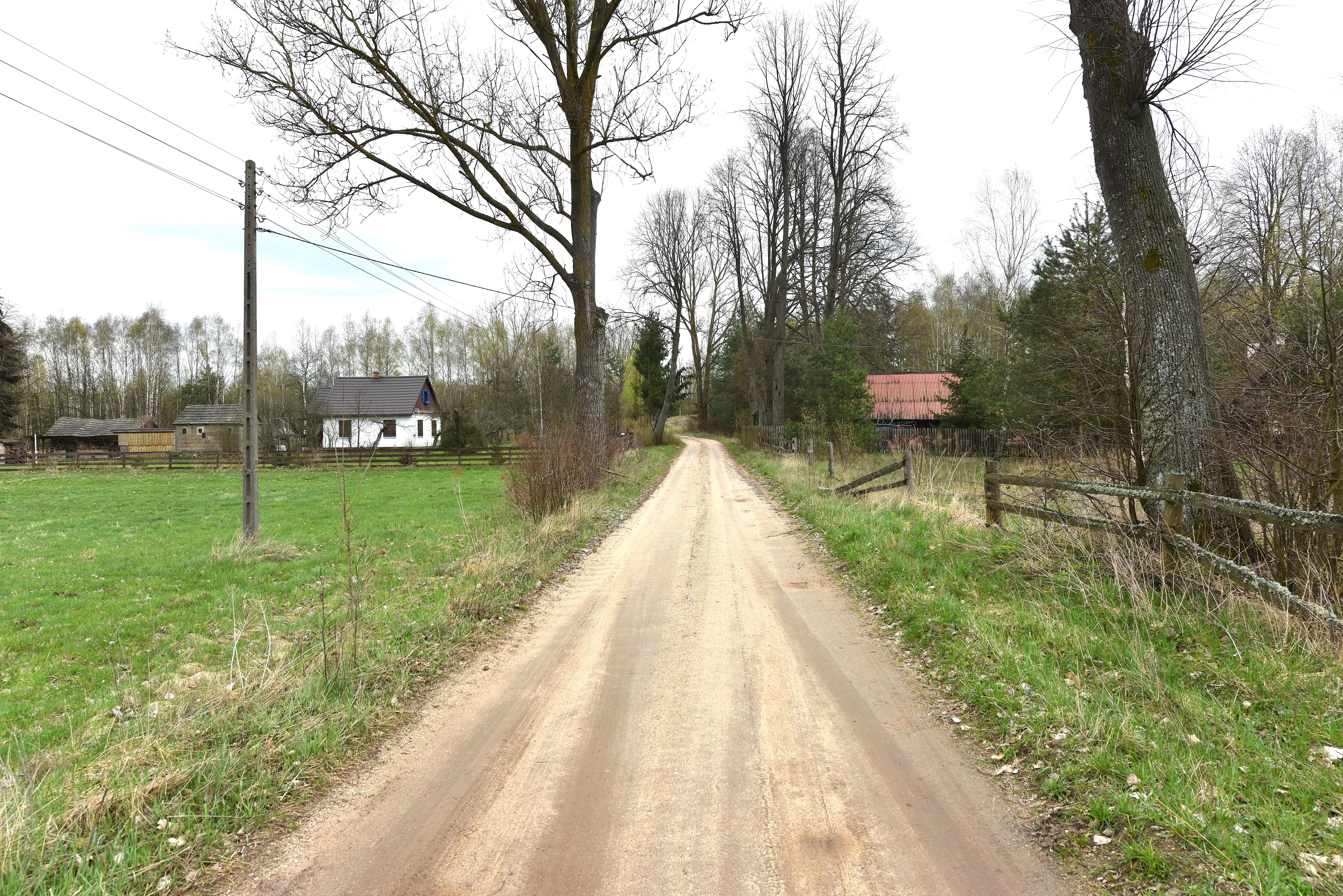
- The village of Gonczary in the Podlaskie Voivodeship

- Location within Poland
- Coordinates: 53°01′36″N 23°53′06″E
- Country: Poland
- Voivodeship: Podlaskie
- County: Białystok
- Gmina: Michałowo

Gonczary [ɡɔnˈt͡ʂarɨ] is a village in the administrative district of Gmina Michałowo, within Białystok County, Podlaskie Voivodeship, in north-eastern Poland, close to the border with Belarus.
