= Kituryki =

- Village
- Location within Poland
- Coordinates: 53°00′31″N 23°34′41″E
- Country: Poland
- Voivodeship: Podlaskie
- County: Białystok
- Gmina: Michałowo

Kituryki [kituˈrɨki] is a village in the administrative district of Gmina Michałowo, within Białystok County, Podlaskie Voivodeship, in north-eastern Poland, close to the border with Belarus.
