= Kowalowy Gród =

Village in Gmina Michałowo, Poland

- Village
- Location within Poland
- Coordinates: 52°58′08″N 23°42′16″E
- Country: Poland
- Voivodeship: Podlaskie
- County: Białystok
- Gmina: Michałowo

Kowalowy Gród [kɔvaˈlɔvɨ ˈɡrut] is a village that is located in the administrative district of Gmina Michałowo, within Białystok County, Podlaskie Voivodeship, in north-eastern Poland, close to the border with Belarus.
