= Kondratki =

- Village
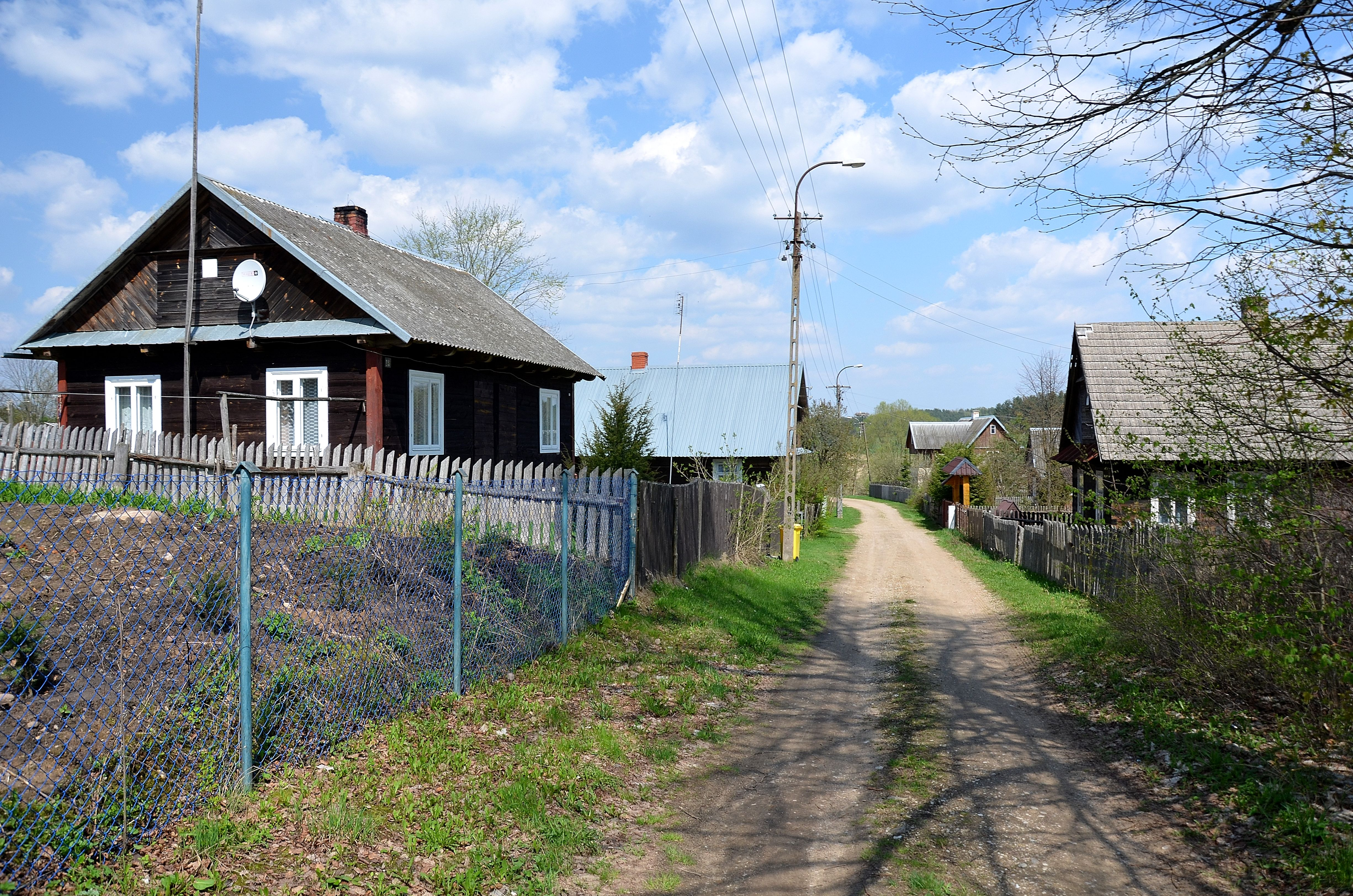
- View of the village, May 2013

- Location within Poland
- Coordinates: 53°2′N 23°55′E
- Country: Poland
- Voivodeship: Podlaskie
- County: Białystok
- Gmina: Michałowo

Kondratki [kɔnˈdratki] is a village in the administrative district of Gmina Michałowo, within Białystok County, Podlaskie Voivodeship, in north-eastern Poland, close to the border with Belarus.
