= Tanica Górna =

- Village
- Location within Poland
- Coordinates: 52°57′N 23°44′E
- Country: Poland
- Voivodeship: Podlaskie
- County: Białystok
- Gmina: Michałowo

Tanica Górna [taˈnit͡sa ˈɡurna] is a village in the administrative district of Gmina Michałowo, within Białystok County, Podlaskie Voivodeship, in north-eastern Poland, close to the border with Belarus.
