= Mostowlany-Kolonia =

- Village
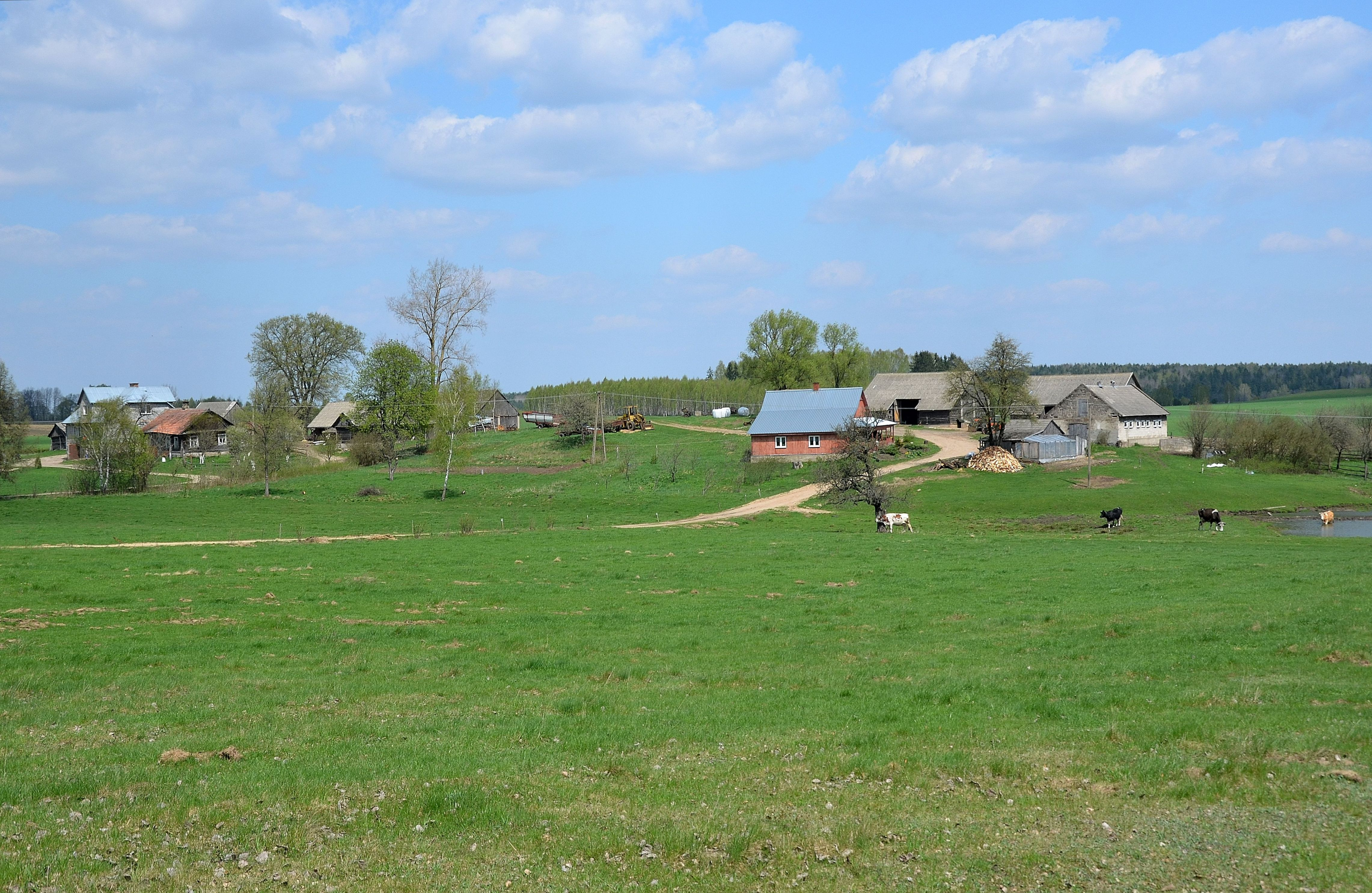

- Location within Poland
- Coordinates: 53°01′38″N 23°36′56″E
- Country: Poland
- Voivodeship: Podlaskie
- County: Białystok
- Gmina: Michałowo

Mostowlany-Kolonia [mɔstɔˈvlanɨ kɔˈlɔɲa] is a village in an administrative district of Gmina Michałowo, within Białystok County, Podlaskie Voivodeship, in north-eastern Poland, close to the border with Belarus.
