= Zajma =

- Village
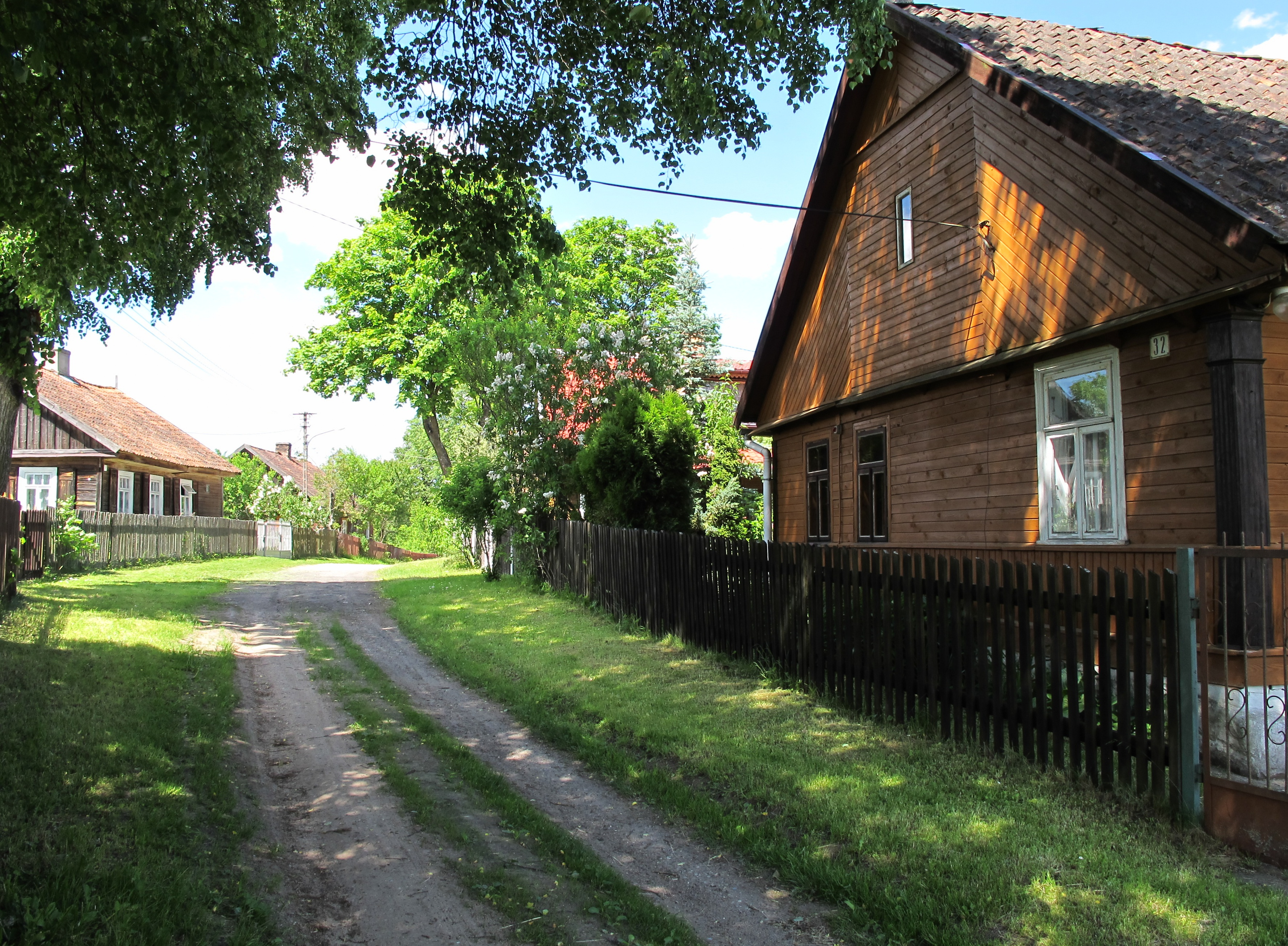

- Location within Poland
- Coordinates: 53°5′24″N 23°28′24″E
- Country: Poland
- Voivodeship: Podlaskie
- County: Białystok
- Gmina: Michałowo

Zajma [ˈzai̯ma] is a village in the administrative district of Gmina Michałowo, within Białystok County, Podlaskie Voivodeship, in north-eastern Poland, close to the border with Belarus.
