= Garbary, Podlaskie Voivodeship =

Garbary
- Village
- Location within Poland
- Coordinates: 52°56′36.70″N 23°46′03.89″E
- Country: Poland
- Voivodeship: Podlaskie
- County: Białystok
- Gmina: Michałowo

Garbary [ɡarˈbarɨ] is a village in the administrative district of Gmina Michałowo, within Białystok County, Podlaskie Voivodeship, in north-eastern Poland, close to the border with Belarus.
