= Krukowszczyzna, Białystok County =

Village in Gmina Michałowo, Poland

Krukowszczyzna
- Village
- Location within Poland
- Coordinates: 53°01′11″N 23°35′12″E
- Country: Poland
- Voivodeship: Podlaskie
- County: Białystok
- Gmina: Michałowo

Krukowszczyzna [krukɔfʂˈt͡ʂɨzna] is a village in the administrative district of Gmina Michałowo, within Białystok County, Podlaskie Voivodeship, in north-eastern Poland, close to the border with Belarus.
