= Pólko, Gmina Michałowo =

Village in Gmina Michałowo, Poland

Pólko
- Village
- Location within Poland
- Coordinates: 52°59′18″N 23°43′17″E
- Country: Poland
- Voivodeship: Podlaskie
- County: Białystok
- Gmina: Michałowo

Pólko (Polish pronunciation: [ˈpulko]) is a village in the administrative district of Gmina Michałowo, within Białystok County, Podlaskie Voivodeship, in north-eastern Poland, close to the border with Belarus.
