= Szymon Romańczuk =

Polish Eastern Orthodox cleric

Szymon (Romańczuk)
- Archbishop of Łódź and Poznań
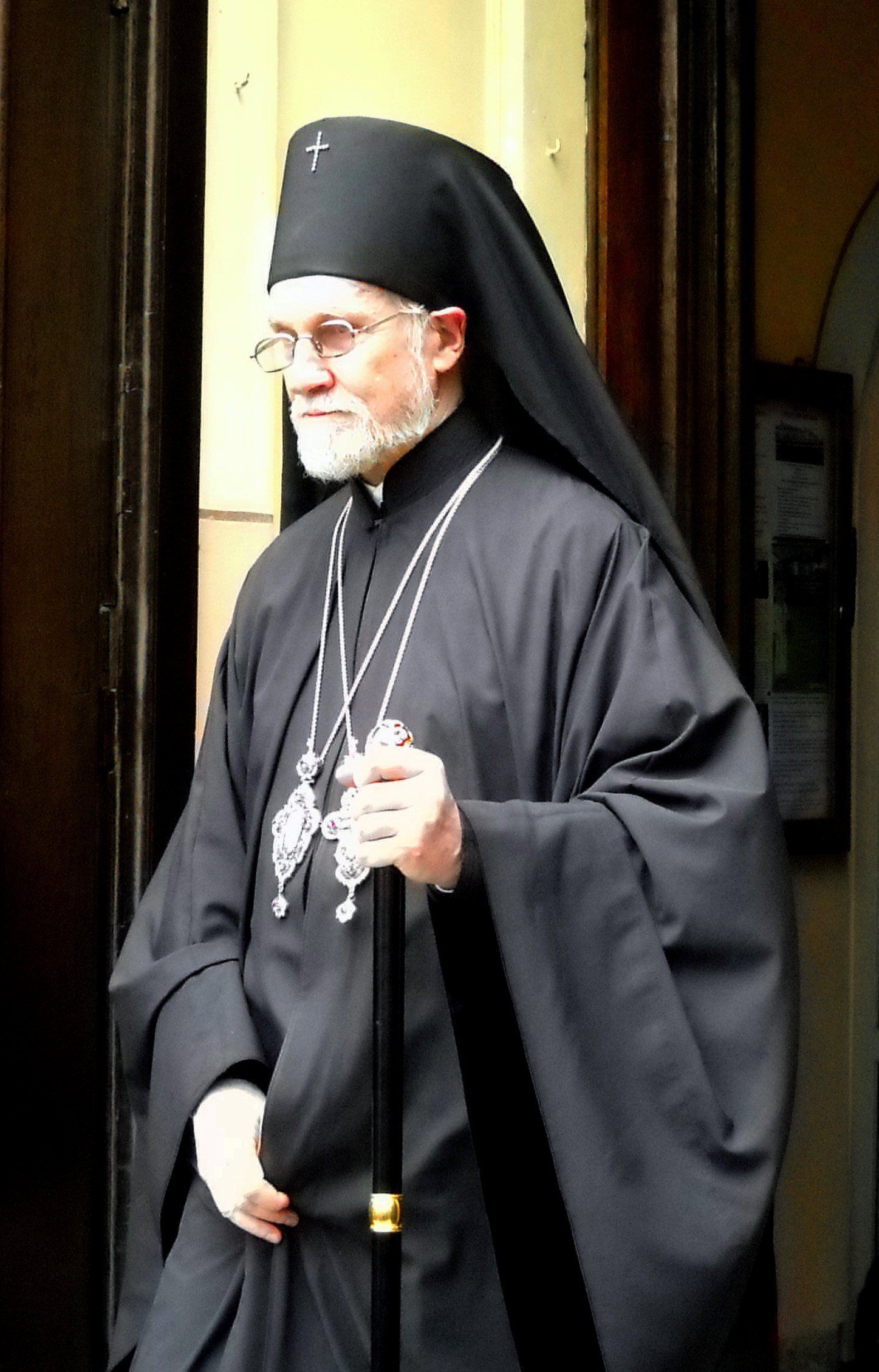
- Church: Polish Orthodox Church
- Elected: 1981
- Predecessor: Sawa (Hrycuniak)
- Successor: Atanazy (Nos)

Orders
- Ordination: 1970
- Consecration: 1979

Personal details
- Born: 12 August 1936 Guszczewina, Poland
- Died: 28 June 2017 (aged 80) Łódź, Poland

Archbishop Szymon, (secular birth name Szymon Romańczuk; 12 August 1936 – 28 June 2017). was the Archbishop of Łódź and Poznań.

== Biography ==
In 1955, he graduated from the pedagogical secondary school in Bielsk Podlaski and began to study philology in Minsk. He graduated from the defense of a thesis devoted to the life and work of Eliza Orzeszkowa. After returning to Poland, he became a teacher of Russian, Belarusian and Latin at the high school in Michałów. In 1965, he was admitted to the second year of studies in Orthodox theology at the Christian Theological Academy in Warsaw. On 1 February 1970, he became the head of the office of the Metropolitan of Warsaw and of the whole of Poland. On 11 February 1970, Bazyli made his perpetual vows before the metropolitan of Warsaw and all of Poland. Four days later he was ordained a deacon, and on 22 February of the same year – as priest. On 21 September 1970, he was appointed inspector of the Orthodox Theological Seminary in Warsaw, where he was previously employed as a foreign language teacher and catechesis lecturer. A year later, he became the chairman of the Publishing and Press Commission at the Metropolitan Council and its secretary. In the period from 1971, as a representative of the PAKP or a member of its delegation, he participated in numerous theological conferences and inter-church meetings. In 1973, he was elevated to the rank of ihumen, and on November 25, 1979 - archimandrite. In October 1979, he was awarded the title of an honorary member of the Orthodox Theological Academy in Crete. At the Christian Academy of Theology, he also defended his doctoral dissertation on Religious and Social Thoughts in the Works of Dostoevsky

On 26 November 1979, in the cathedral of St. Mary Magdalene in Warsaw, he was consecrated bishop with the title of bishop of Lublin, vicar of the Warsaw-Bielsko diocese took place. The consecrators were the metropolitan of Warsaw and all of Poland Bazyli, the archbishop of Białystok and Gdańsk Nikanor, the archbishop of Wrocław and Szczecin Aleksy, and the bishop of Łódź and Poznań Bishop Sawa.

On 18 August 1981, he moved to the cathedral in Łódź and Poznań. On 8 June 1993, he was elevated to the rank of Archbishop.

On 18 April 2010, during the funeral mass of Lech and Maria Kaczyński in St. Mary's Basilica in Kraków, Archbishop Szymon (next to the Metropolitan of Warsaw Kazimierz Nycz) conducted a funeral liturgy in the Byzantine Rite.

In 2016, he was a member of the delegation of the Polish Autocephalous Orthodox Church to the Holy and Great Council of the Orthodox Church.

He died on 28 June 2017 in Łódź and was buried in the Orthodox part of the Doły cemetery in the same city.

Eastern Orthodox Church titles
Preceded by Sawa (Hrycuniak)	Bishop of Łódź and Poznań; 1981–1993	Succeeded by Atanazy (Nos) (in 2017)
New title	Archbishop of Łódź and Poznań; 1993–2017	Vacant
