= Brzezina, Podlaskie Voivodeship =

Brzezina
- Village
- Location within Poland
- Coordinates: 52°56′05″N 23°49′56″E
- Country: Poland
- Voivodeship: Podlaskie
- County: Białystok
- Gmina: Michałowo

Brzezina [bʐɛˈʑina] is a village in the administrative district of Gmina Michałowo, within Białystok County, Podlaskie Voivodeship, in north-eastern Poland, close to the border with Belarus.
