= Kopce, Podlaskie Voivodeship =

Kopce
- Village
- Location within Poland
- Coordinates: 53°00′06″N 23°54′06″E
- Country: Poland
- Voivodeship: Podlaskie
- County: Białystok
- Gmina: Michałowo

Kopce [ˈkɔpt͡sɛ] is a village in the administrative district of Gmina Michałowo, within Białystok County, Podlaskie Voivodeship, in north-eastern Poland, close to the border with Belarus.
