= Bołtryki =

- Village
- Location within Poland
- Coordinates: 52°56′36.14″N 23°46′57.37″E
- Country: Poland
- Voivodeship: Podlaskie
- County: Białystok
- Gmina: Michałowo

Bołtryki [bɔu̯ˈtrɨki] is a village in the administrative district of Gmina Michałowo, within Białystok County, Podlaskie Voivodeship, in north-eastern Poland, close to the border with Belarus.

== History ==
In the interwar period, no significant event was recorded in the village, and World War II did not cause any major losses. However, it was recorded that in the second half of July 1944, the retreating German Army and Russian Liberation Army troops confiscated 15 horses, 11 cattle, 9 pigs, and 10 sheep. After World War II, in 1964, the entire village was electrified.

From the 1950s until 1980, rural residents did not migrate, the population was stable and remained more or less at the same level. This changed in 1980. Several families sold their farms to the state and left Bołtryki for Białystok. The village was completely displaced by 1982 and then razed to the ground due to the construction of the Siemianówka Reservoir. It sank underwater in 1988.
