= Sacharki =

- Village
- Location within Poland
- Coordinates: 52°56′45″N 23°45′15″E
- Country: Poland
- Voivodeship: Podlaskie
- County: Białystok
- Gmina: Michałowo

Sacharki [saˈxarki] is a village in the administrative district of Gmina Michałowo, within Białystok County, Podlaskie Voivodeship, in north-eastern Poland, close to the border with Belarus. It is around 40 km (25 mi) south-east of the city of Białystok.
