= Kazimierowo, Podlaskie Voivodeship =

Kazimierowo
- Village
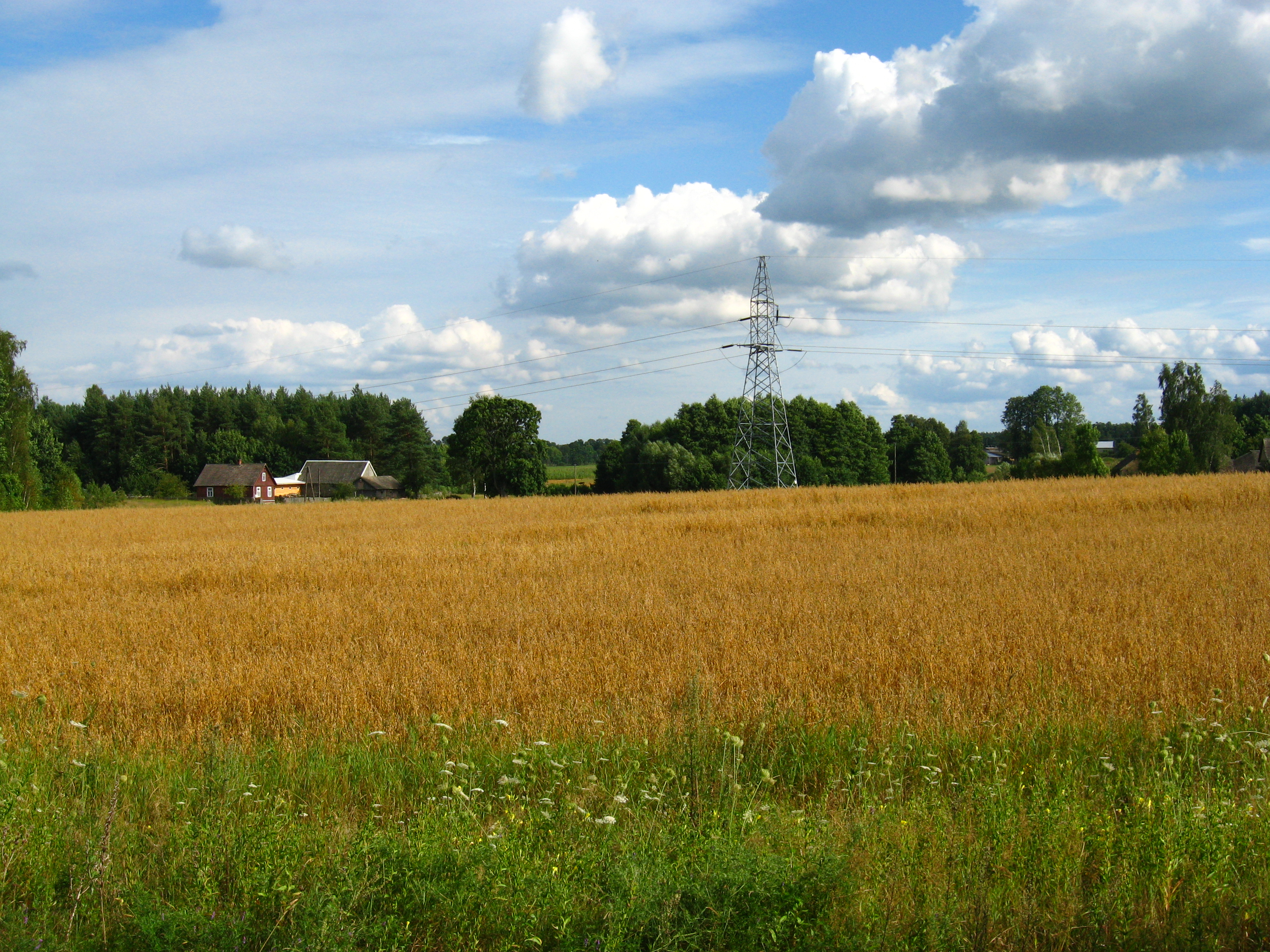
- View from the road from/to Michałowo; behind trees: Kazimierowo village

- Location within Poland
- Coordinates: 53°01′01″N 23°34′01″E
- Country: Poland
- Voivodeship: Podlaskie
- County: Białystok
- Gmina: Michałowo

Kazimierowo [kaʑimjɛˈrɔvɔ] is a village in the administrative district of Gmina Michałowo, within Białystok County, Podlaskie Voivodeship, in north-eastern Poland, close to the border with Belarus.
