= Sokole, Podlaskie Voivodeship =

Sokole
- Village
- Location within Poland
- Coordinates: 53°5′9″N 23°30′59″E
- Country: Poland
- Voivodeship: Podlaskie
- County: Białystok
- Gmina: Michałowo

Sokole [sɔˈkɔlɛ] is a village in the administrative district of Gmina Michałowo, within Białystok County, Podlaskie Voivodeship, in north-eastern Poland, close to the border with Belarus.

According to the 1921 census, the village was inhabited by 142 people, among whom 74 were Roman Catholic, 60 Orthodox, 1 Evangelical and 7 Mosaic. At the same time, 75 inhabitants declared Polish nationality, 60 Belarusian and 7 Jewish. There were 30 residential buildings in the village.
