= Gmina Michałowo =

Gmina Michałowo Michałowo Commune
- Gmina
- Coat of arms

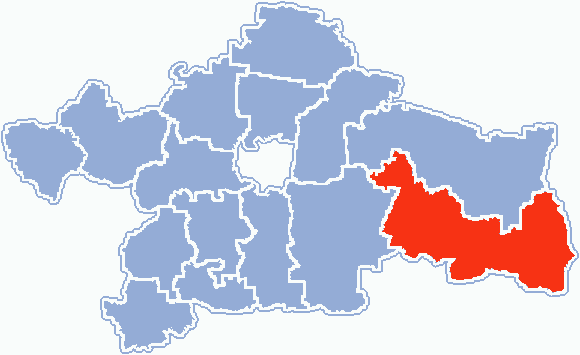
- Location within Białystok County
- Coordinates (Michałowo): 53°2′12″N 23°36′13″E
- Country: Poland
- Voivodeship: Podlaskie
- County: Białystok County
- Seat: Michałowo

Area
  - Total: 409.19 km^{2} (157.99 sq mi)

Population (2006)
  - Total: 7,263
  - Density: 17.75/km^{2} (45.97/sq mi)
- Website: http://michalowo.anawoj.org/

Gmina Michałowo is an urban-rural gmina (administrative district) in Białystok County, Podlaskie Voivodeship, in north-eastern Poland, on the border with Belarus. Its seat is the town of Michałowo, which lies approximately 31 kilometres (19 mi) east of the regional capital Białystok. (Michałowo gained town status on 1 January 2009 – prior to that the district was classed as a rural gmina.)

The gmina covers an area of 409.19 square kilometres (158.0 sq mi), and as of 2006 its total population is 7,263, out of which the population of Michałowo is 3,343.

The gmina contains part of the protected area called Knyszyń Forest Landscape Park.

== Villages ==
Apart from the town of Michałowo, the gmina contains the villages and settlements of Bachury, Bagniuki, Barszczewo, Bieńdziuga, Bołtryki, Bondary, Borsukowizna, Brzezina, Budy, Cisówka, Ciwoniuki, Dublany, Garbary, Gonczary, Gorbacze, Hieronimowo, Hoźna, Jałówka, Julianka, Juszkowy Gród, Kalitnik, Kamienny Bród, Kazimierowo, Kituryki, Kobylanka, Kokotowo, Kokotowo-Leśniczówka, Koleśne, Kondratki, Kopce, Kowalowy Gród, Krugły Lasek, Krukowszczyzna, Krynica, Kuchmy-Kuce, Kuchmy-Pietruki, Kuryły, Leonowicze, Lewsze, Maciejkowa Góra, Majdan, Marynka, Michałowo-Kolonia, Mościska, Mostowlany-Kolonia, Nowa Łuplanka, Nowa Wola, Nowe Kuchmy, Nowosady, Odnoga-Kuźmy, Osiedle Bondary, Oziabły, Pieńki, Pieńki-Kolonia, Planty, Pólko, Potoka, Rochental, Romanowo, Rudnia, Rybaki, Sacharki, Sokole, Stanek, Stara Łuplanka, Stare Kuchmy, Supruny, Suszcza, Świnobród, Szymki, Tanica Dolna, Tanica Górna, Tokarowszczyzna, Topolany, Tylwica, Tylwica-Kolonia, Tylwica-Majątek, Wierch-Topolany, Zajma, Zaleszany and Żednia.

== Neighbouring gminas ==
Gmina Michałowo is bordered by the gminas of Gródek, Narew, Narewka and Zabłudów. It also borders Belarus.
