= Marynka, Podlaskie Voivodeship =

Marynka
- Village
- Location within Poland
- Coordinates: 52°57′27″N 23°37′28″E
- Country: Poland
- Voivodeship: Podlaskie
- County: Białystok
- Gmina: Michałowo

Marynka [maˈrɨŋka] is a village in the administrative district of Gmina Michałowo, within Białystok County, Podlaskie Voivodeship, in north-eastern Poland, close to the border with Belarus.
