= Michałowo-Kolonia =

Village in Gmina Michałowo, Poland

- Village
- Location within Poland
- Coordinates: 53°02′58″N 23°36′06″E
- Country: Poland
- Voivodeship: Podlaskie
- County: Białystok
- Gmina: Michałowo

Michałowo-Kolonia [mixaˈwɔvɔ kɔˈlɔɲa] is a village in the administrative district of Gmina Michałowo, in Białystok County, Podlaskie Voivodeship, in northeastern Poland, close to the border with Belarus.
