= Stanek, Podlaskie Voivodeship =

Stanek
- Village
- Location within Poland
- Coordinates: 53°6′21″N 23°29′53″E
- Country: Poland
- Voivodeship: Podlaskie
- County: Białystok
- Gmina: Michałowo

Stanek [ˈstanɛk] is a village in the administrative district of Gmina Michałowo, Białystok County, Podlaskie Voivodeship, Poland.
