= Romanowo, Podlaskie Voivodeship =

Romanowo
- Village
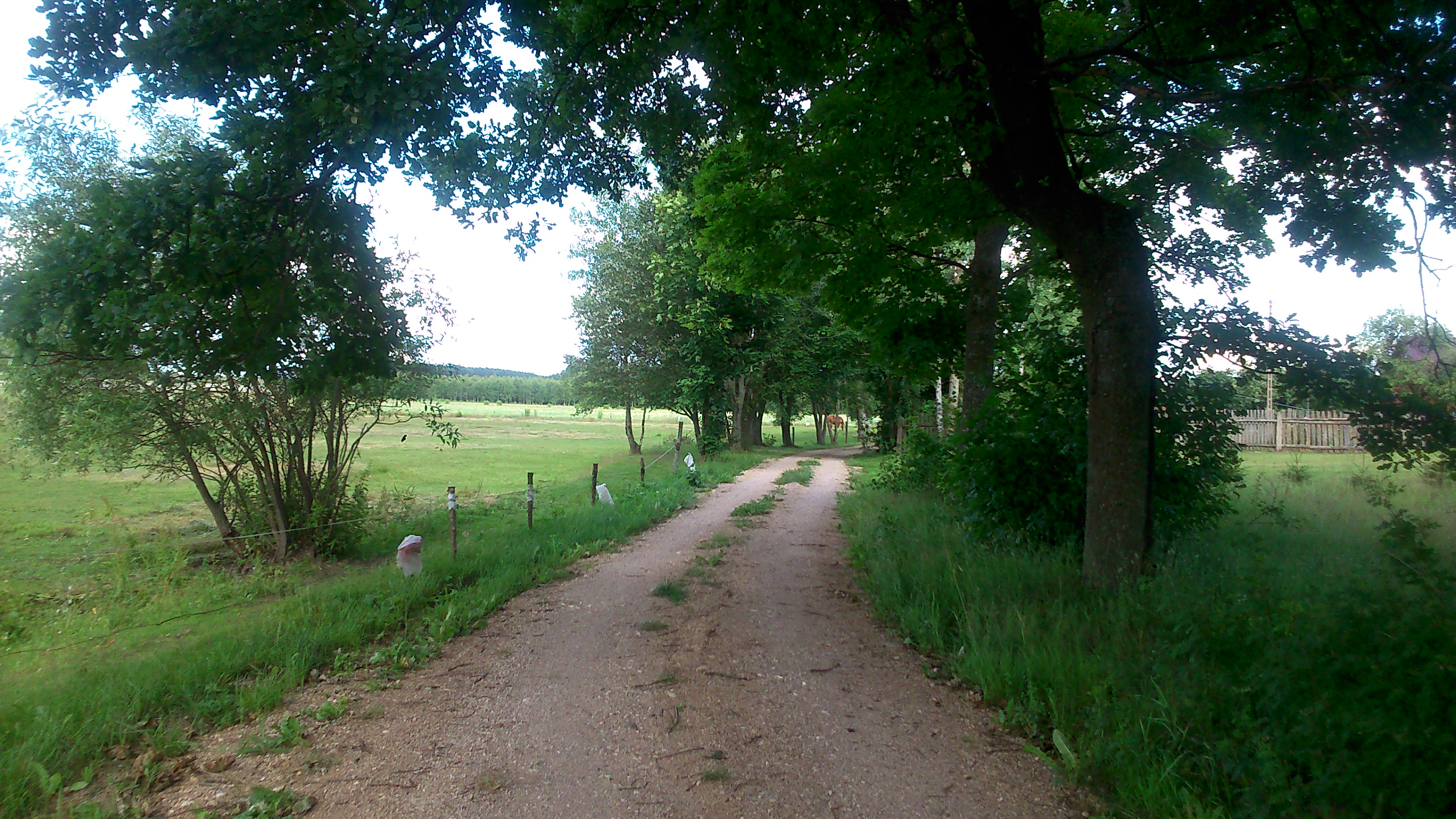
- Unpaved road in Romanowo

- Location within Poland
- Coordinates: 52°56′09″N 23°45′51″E
- Country: Poland
- Voivodeship: Podlaskie
- County: Białystok
- Gmina: Michałowo

Romanowo [rɔmaˈnɔvɔ] is a village in the administrative district of Gmina Michałowo, within Białystok County, Podlaskie Voivodeship, in north-eastern Poland, close to the border with Belarus.
