= Majdan, Białystok County =

Majdan
- Village
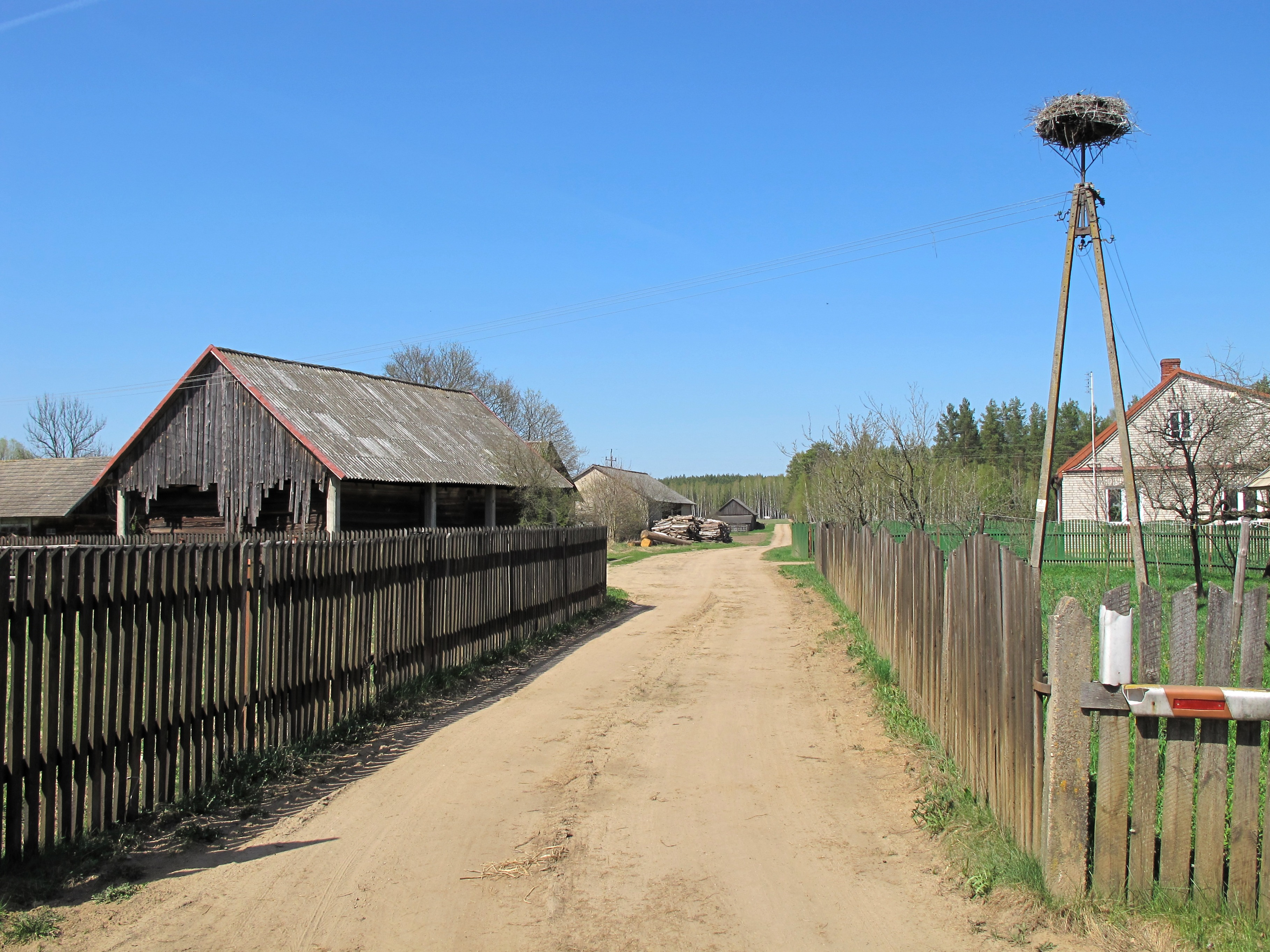
- Road in Majdan

- Location within Poland
- Coordinates: 52°58′00″N 23°42′59″E
- Country: Poland
- Voivodeship: Podlaskie
- County: Białystok
- Gmina: Michałowo

Majdan (Polish pronunciation: [ˈmajdan]) is a village in the administrative district of Gmina Michałowo, within Białystok County, Podlaskie Voivodeship, in north-eastern Poland, close to the border with Belarus.
