= Świnobród, Podlaskie Voivodeship =

Świnobród
- Settlement
- Location within Poland
- Coordinates: 53°6′21″N 23°29′53″E
- Country: Poland
- Voivodeship: Podlaskie
- County: Białystok
- Gmina: Michałowo

Świnobród [ɕfiˈnɔbrut] is a settlement in the administrative district of Gmina Michałowo, within Białystok County, Podlaskie Voivodeship, in north-eastern Poland, close to the border with Belarus.
