= Topolany, Poland =

Topolany
- Village
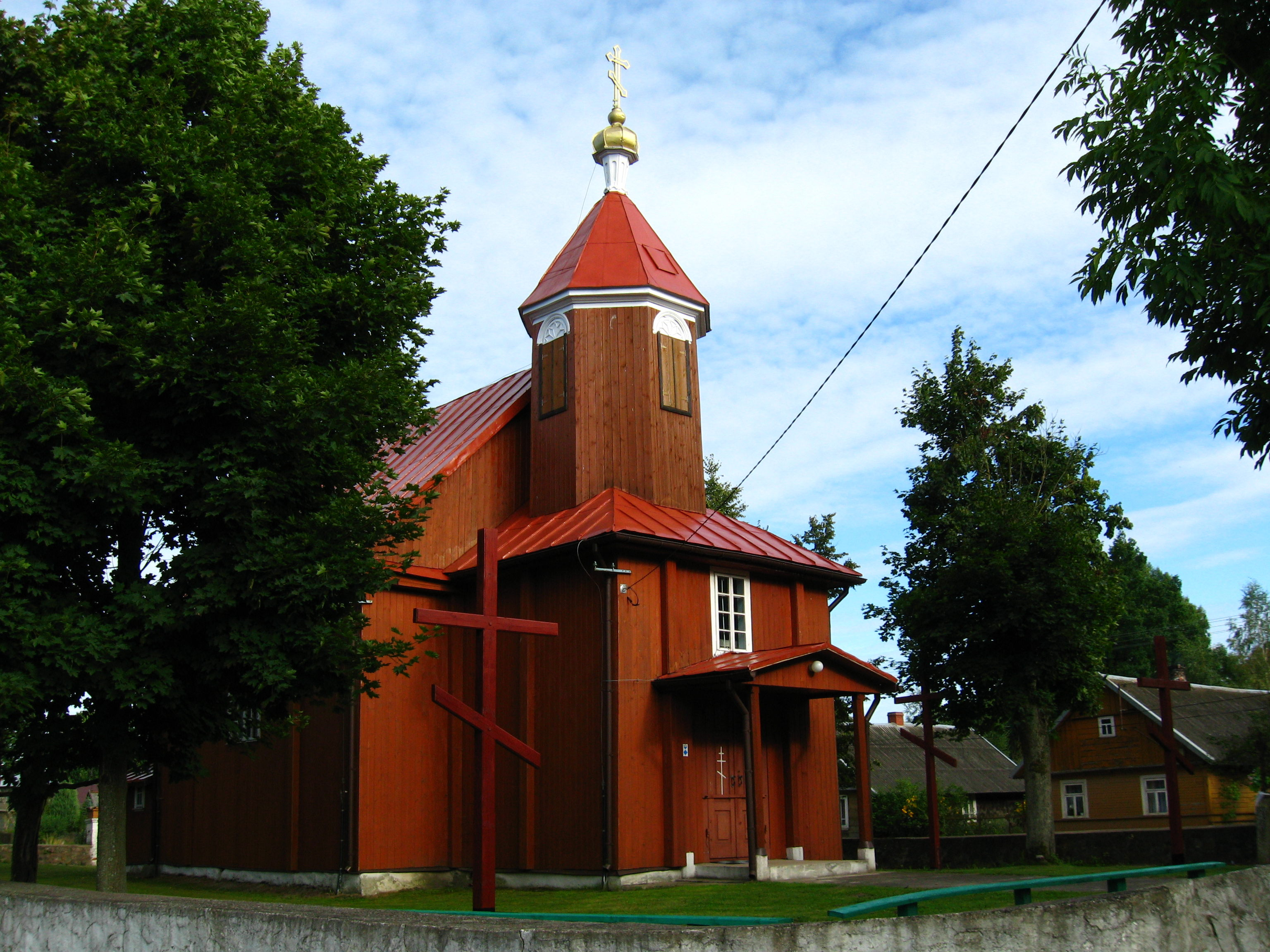
- Orthodox Church of the Transfiguration of Christ

- Location within Poland
- Coordinates: 53°1′N 23°31′E
- Country: Poland
- Voivodeship: Podlaskie
- County: Białystok
- Gmina: Michałowo

Topolany [tɔpɔˈlanɨ] is a village in the administrative district of Gmina Michałowo, within Białystok County, Podlaskie Voivodeship, in north-eastern Poland, close to the border with Belarus.
