= Navasady, Grodno District =

Village in Grodno Region, Belarus

Navasady Навасады
- Village
- Location within Belarus
- Coordinates: 53°47′48″N 23°40′31″E
- Country: Belarus
- Region: Grodno Region
- District: Grodno District
- Time zone: UTC+3 (MSK)

Navasady (Belarusian: Навасады, Polish: Nowosady) is a village in Grodno District, Grodno Region, in western Belarus.

== History ==
In the interwar period, Nowosady, as it was known in Polish, was administratively located in the Augustów County in the Białystok Voivodeship of Poland. According to the 1921 census, population was entirely Polish by nationality and Catholic by confession.

Following the invasion of Poland in September 1939, the village was first occupied by the Soviet Union until 1941, then by Nazi Germany until 1944, and then re-occupied by the Soviet Union, which eventually annexed it from Poland in 1945.

== Demographics ==
Historical population
Year	Pop.	±%
1827	75	—
1921	158	+110.7%
