= Jałówka, Gmina Michałowo =

Jałówka
- Village
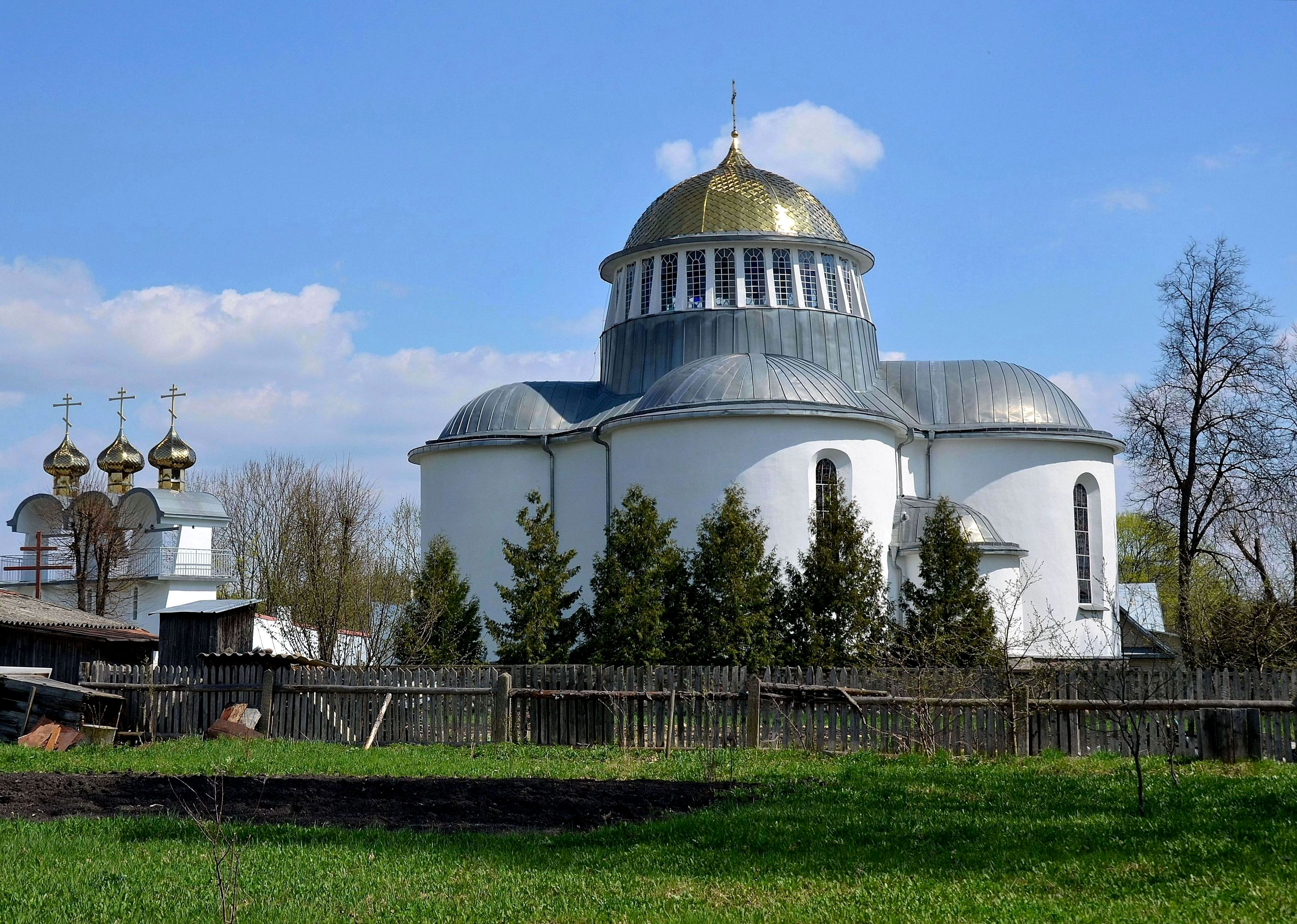
- The Orthodox Church of Exaltation of the Holy Cross in Jałówka

- Location within Poland
- Coordinates: 53°32′N 23°33′E
- Country: Poland
- Voivodeship: Podlaskie
- County: Białystok
- Gmina: Michałowo

Jałówka [jaˈwufka] is a village in the administrative district of Gmina Michałowo, within Białystok County, Podlaskie Voivodeship, in north-eastern Poland, close to the border with Belarus.

It has Eastern Orthodox and Roman Catholic churches.
