= Borsukowizna, Białystok County =

Borsukowizna
- Village
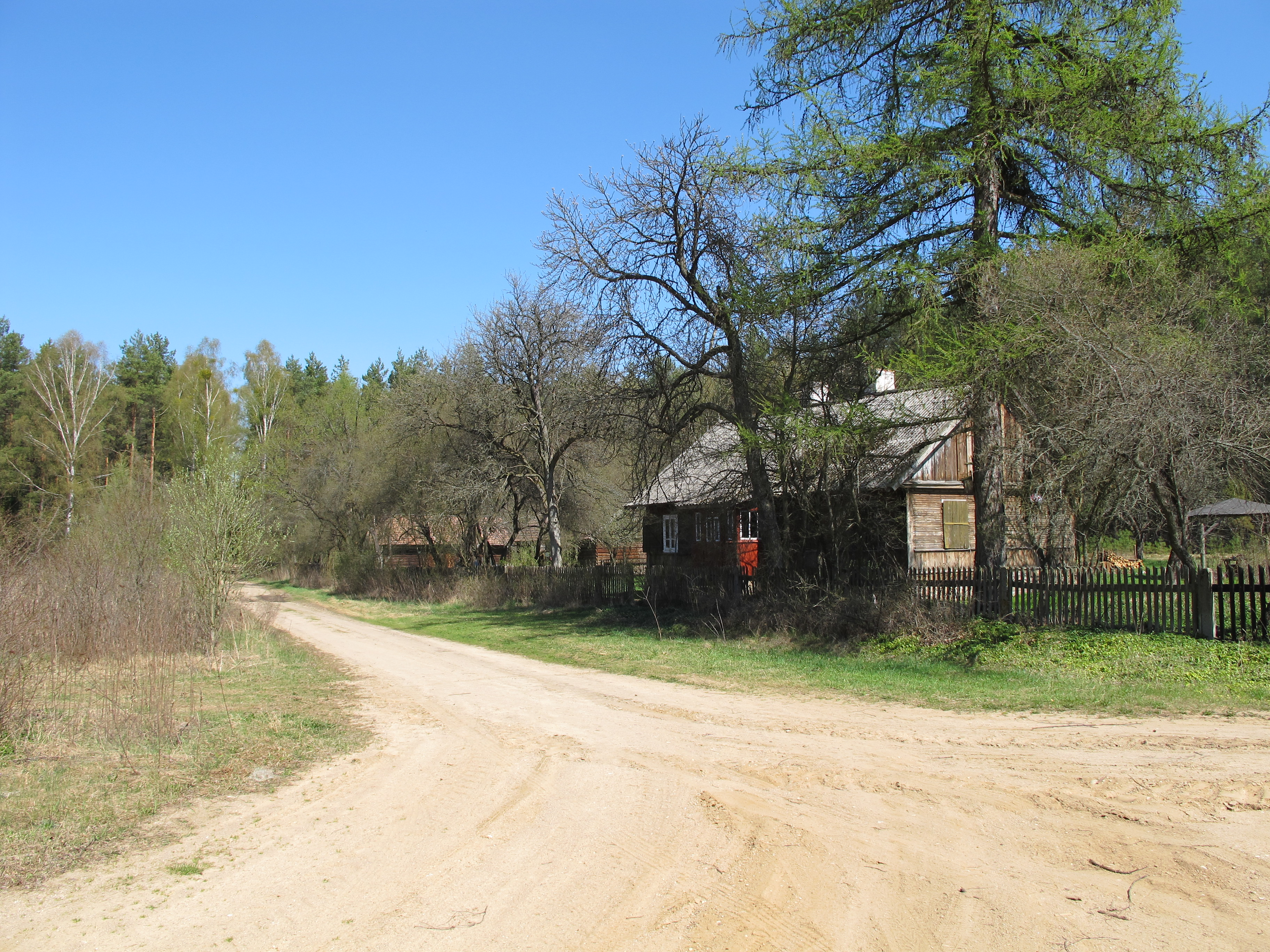
- Borsukowizna, Poland

- Location within Poland
- Coordinates: 53°3′50″N 23°29′9″E
- Country: Poland
- Voivodeship: Podlaskie
- County: Białystok
- Gmina: Michałowo

Borsukowizna [bɔrsukɔˈvizna] is a village in the administrative district of Gmina Michałowo, within Białystok County, Podlaskie Voivodeship, in north-eastern Poland, close to the border with Belarus.
