= Michałowo =

- Town
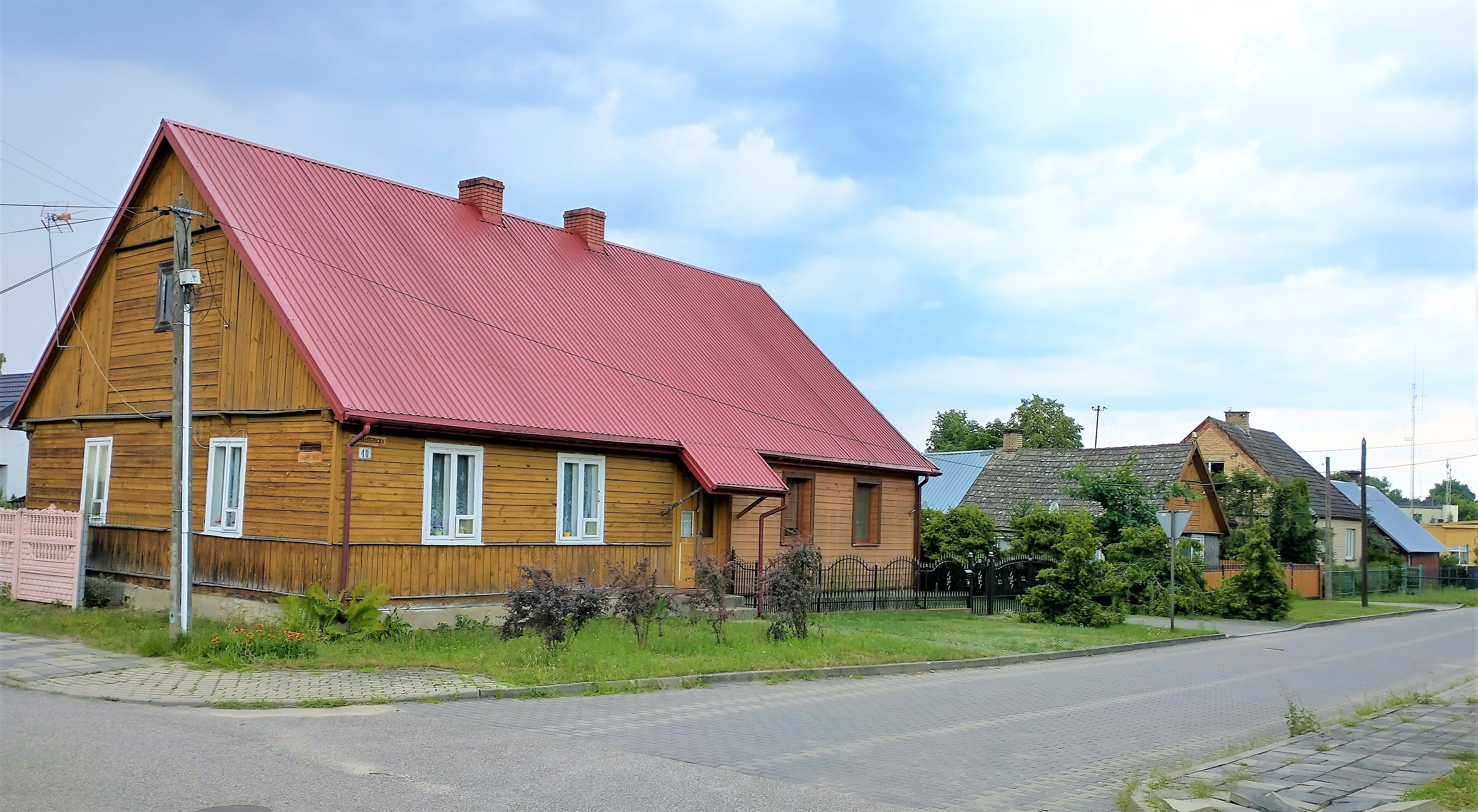
- Town center with preserved old houses

- Coat of arms

- Location within Poland
- Coordinates: 53°2′12″N 23°36′13″E
- Country: Poland
- Voivodeship: Podlaskie
- County: Białystok
- Gmina: Michałowo
- Town rights: 2009

Population
  - Total: 2,750
- Time zone: UTC+1 (CET)
  - Summer (DST): UTC+2 (CEST)
- Postal code: 16-050
- Vehicle registration: BIA
- Website: http://www.michalowo.ug.gov.pl/

Michałowo [mʲixaˈwɔvɔ] (Note: Belarusian: Міхалова) is a town in Białystok County, Podlaskie Voivodeship, in north-eastern Poland, close to the border with Belarus. It is the seat of the gmina (administrative district) called Gmina Michałowo.

The town has a population of 2,750.

== History ==
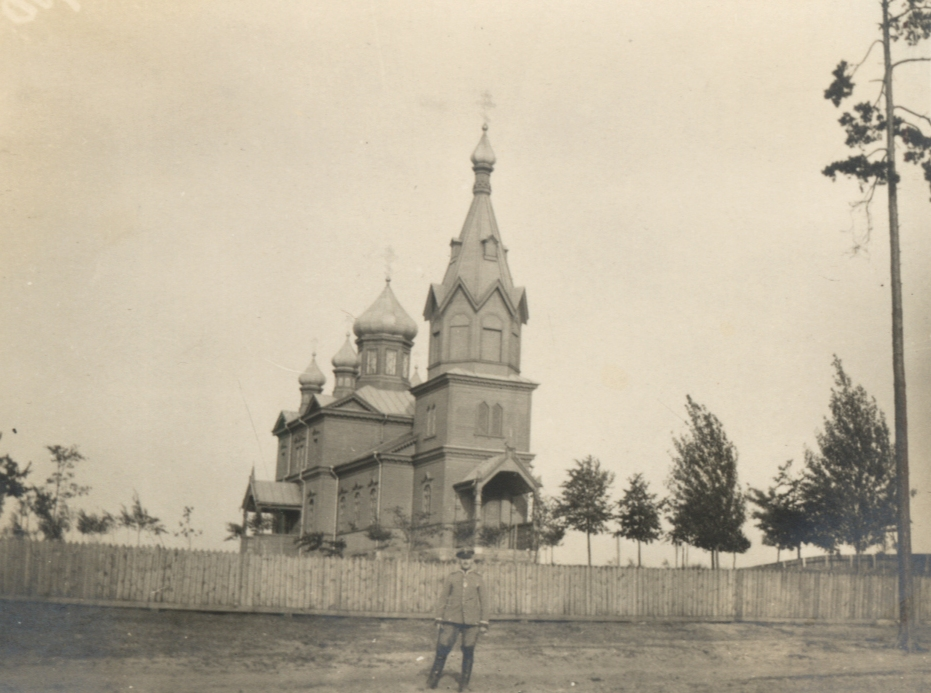
Saint Nicholas church in 1916

As of 1860, there were four cloth factories in Michałowo, employing 650 workers, including 150 foreigners.

Following the German-Soviet invasion of Poland, which started World War II in September 1939, Michałowo was occupied by the Soviet Union until 1941 and then by Germany until 1944.

From 1975 to 1998 it was part of Białystok Voivodeship.

Michałowo received its town rights on 1 January 2009.

In November 2021, several NGOs came to Michałowo to provide humanitarian aid to migrants brought to the Belarusian border east of the town.
