= Jeziorki Ditch =

Ditch Masovian Voivodeship, Poland

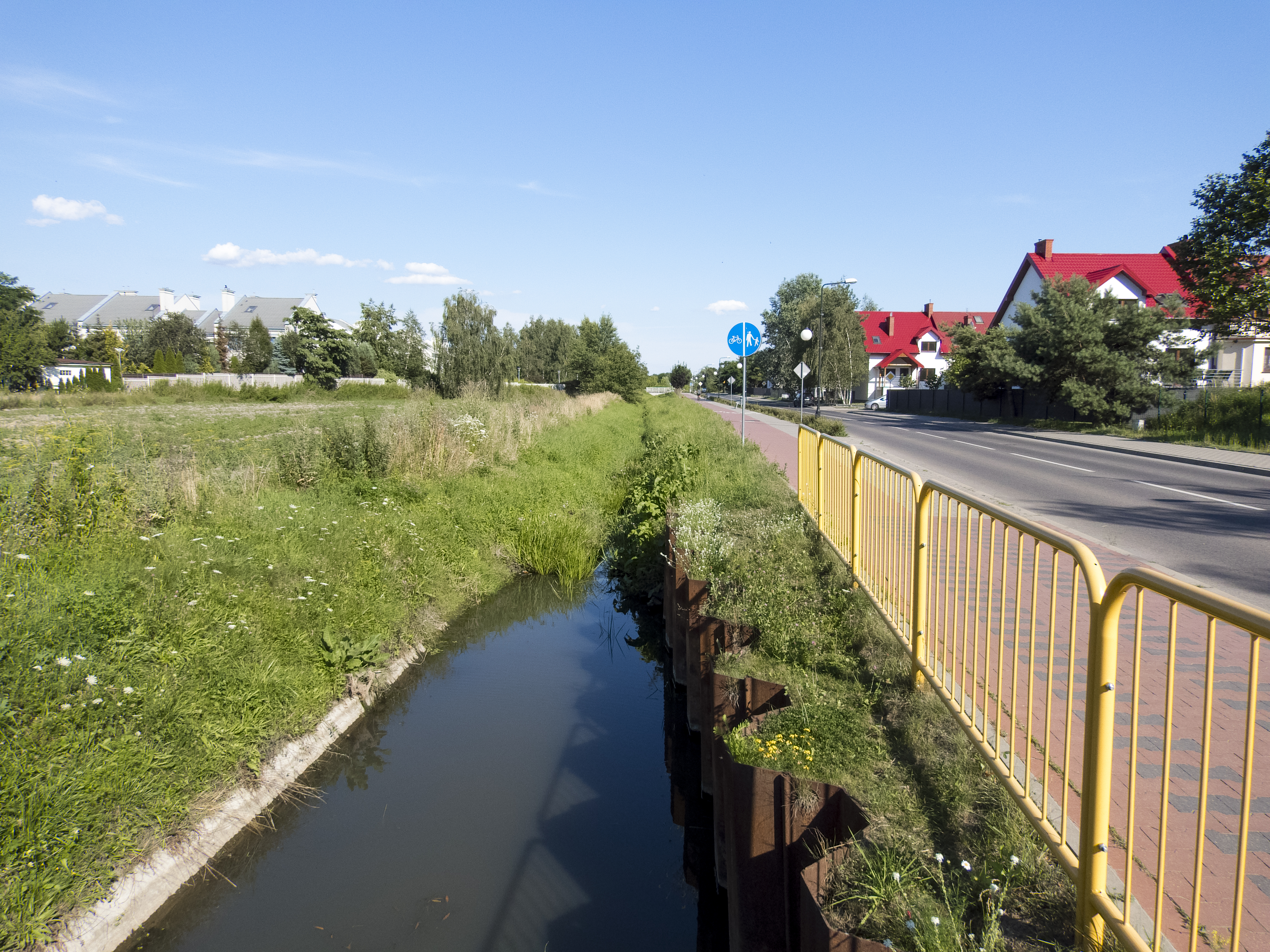
- Jeziorki Ditch at the border of Józefosław and Julianów in Piaseczno County, view east along Cyraneczki Street
- Nicknames: Jeziorki Canal, Zgorzała

Location
- Country: Poland

Physical characteristics
- Source: Nowa Wola, Piaseczno County
  - coordinates: 52.095278°N 20.977222°E
- Mouth: Skolimów (Konstancin-Jeziorna)
  - coordinates: 52.081667°N 21.093611°E
- Length: 10.3 km (6.4 mi)
- Basin size: 21.7089 km^{2} (8.3819 sq mi)

Jeziorki Ditch (also known as Jeziorki Canal) is a ditch in Masovian Voivodeship, Poland, flowing through Gmina Lesznowola, Warsaw's Ursynów district, Gmina Piaseczno, and Gmina Konstancin-Jeziorna. Its length is approximately 10.3 km or about 9 km, with a drainage basin of 19.6 km². The ditch serves as a tributary to the Jeziorka river, provides water retention functions, and supports a fading wildlife corridor along its banks. A trail runs along parts of the ditch for recreational use.

== Location and characteristics ==
The ditch is located in Poland, within the Central Mazovian Lowland (318.7), specifically the Warsaw Plain (318.76), and in the natural-forest regionalization, it lies in the Kutno-Błonie Plain mesoregion of the Mazovian-Podlachian region. It is a left-bank tributary of the Jeziorka river.

According to the National Register of Geographical Names, the ditch's source originates in Gmina Lesznowola near the village of Nowa Wola. Other sources place the origin northwest of Zgorzała Lake (or within the lake itself), just beyond the tracks of Warszawa Zachodnia–Kraków Główny railway, near the Expressway S7 in Warsaw's Ursynów district, specifically Jeziorki area near Baletowa Street. In this version, the ditch flows southeast as an open channel. An underground section begins at the intersection of Chóralna Street and Puławska Street, running parallel to Puławska southward, then crossing it perpendicularly near Jaskółcza Street. After about 150 metres, it reverts to an open channel, passing through Dąbrówka, Gmina Piaseczno (Józefosław, Julianów, and Chyliczki), and then Gmina Konstancin-Jeziorna (Kierszek). It crosses Warszawa Okęcie–Jeziorna railway and voivodeship road 721 (Pułaski Street). The ditch empties into the Jeziorka river in Skolimów at 8.140 km from its mouth.

According to the Hydrographic Division Map of Poland, the ditch has two source sections: a longer one at Nowa Wola and a shorter one in Ursynów (Jeziorki Południowe), south of Karczunkowska Street and east of Nawłocka Street, converging just before the Pozytywka Pond. In this model, the stream north of Karczunkowska Street is an unnamed tributary. The ditch has a hydrological identifier of 25874 and a stream identifier of 167386. In the River Basin Management Plan for the Vistula river basin of 2011, it is classified as a uniform surface water body with the international code PLRW20001725874.

The ditch spans 10.3 km, or about 9 km if originating in Jeziorki, with 3.0 km within Warsaw's boundaries. A 2.68-km section (kilometrage: 5+390–8+070 km) is part of Warsaw's primary drainage system, with a channel bed width of 0.6–0.8 m and a depth of 1.5–2.5 m.

Based on abiotic water typology, it is classified as a lowland sandy stream (type 17). Its origin is natural, with water flowing intermittently, mainly after rainfall or snowmelt.

== Drainage basin ==
The drainage basin is 21.7089 km² (42.57% within Warsaw) or 19.6 km². The area includes numerous water bodies, such as Zgorzała Lake, Pozytywka Pond, Wąsal Pond, Krzewiny Pond, Glinianki pod Lasem Pond, Lipkowski Pond, Czyste Pond, Głęboki Pond, and Nowe Ługi Pond. Tributaries include ditches RA–1 and RA–2 (also known as J–3–1 and J–3–2), ditch R–B (J–2), and collector B–4 (R–1 or J–3–3), which runs along Warsaw's southern border, separating it from Mysiadło. Near Karmazynowa Street in Dąbrówka, a branch called Stary Jeziorki Canal exists. The ditch is also fed by a pre-World War II drainage network from Ursynów.

The ditch flows through clay-based terrain. Some water bodies in its drainage basin, like Zgorzała and Glinianki pod Lasem, are former clay pits. The Jeziorki Ditch valley features humus sands and valley bottom silt. In Warsaw, it primarily passes through single-family housing areas; in Piaseczno County, the development is denser, while near the mouth in Gmina Konstancin-Jeziorna, urbanization decreases.

== Water retention ==
Jeziorki Ditch serves a retention function, draining about 25% of Ursynów's surface area. It has nine water control structures. Due to clayey soil, infilling of water bodies, increasing urbanization, uncontrolled modifications to the ditch and its tributaries, variable channel cross-sections, and poorly designed culverts, significant flooding has occurred, notably in Dąbrówka in 2010 and repeatedly in Józefosław. Consequently, Ursynów district has undertaken reclamation of water bodies in the catchment, such as Czyste Pond in 2003 and Pozytywka and Wąsal Ponds in 2013.

In June 2020, the Warsaw Greenery Board announced plans to build additional water control and flow regulation structures on the ditch as part of the "Warsaw Water Resources Protection Program" to mitigate climate change impacts.

== Ecology and water quality ==
Part of the ditch flows through the Warsaw Protected Landscape Area, established by the Warsaw Voivode's ordinance on 29 August 1997, and the buffer zone of the Kabaty Woods.

The ditch, along with adjacent ditches R–4 and R–4–2, forms a local wildlife corridor that is gradually disappearing, linked to the broader Vistula valley corridor.

A green trail runs along parts of the ditch from the Warszawa Dawidy railway station to the Powsin Culture Park.

A 2009 study rated the ditch's ecological status as poor, primarily due to the condition of phytoplankton. Levels of nitrogen, phosphorus, and biochemical oxygen demand (BOD_{5}) also exceeded good status criteria. In 2020, due to insufficient monitoring data, the ecological status was estimated as moderate by transferring the classification from a similar watercourse.

== Gallery ==
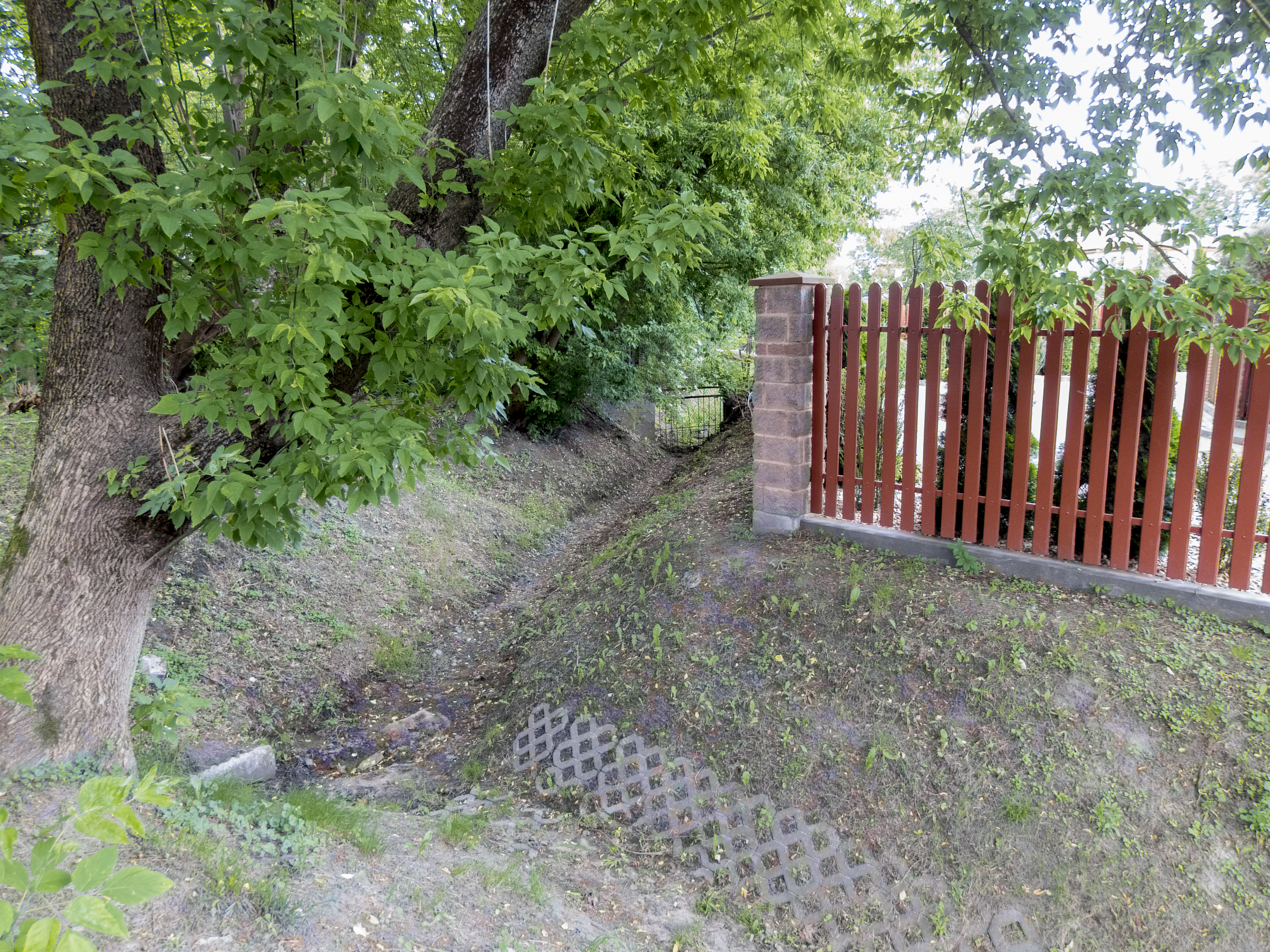
Old Jeziorki Ditch in Warsaw's Dąbrówka, near Karmazynowa Street, view from the southeast, joining a smaller local ditch

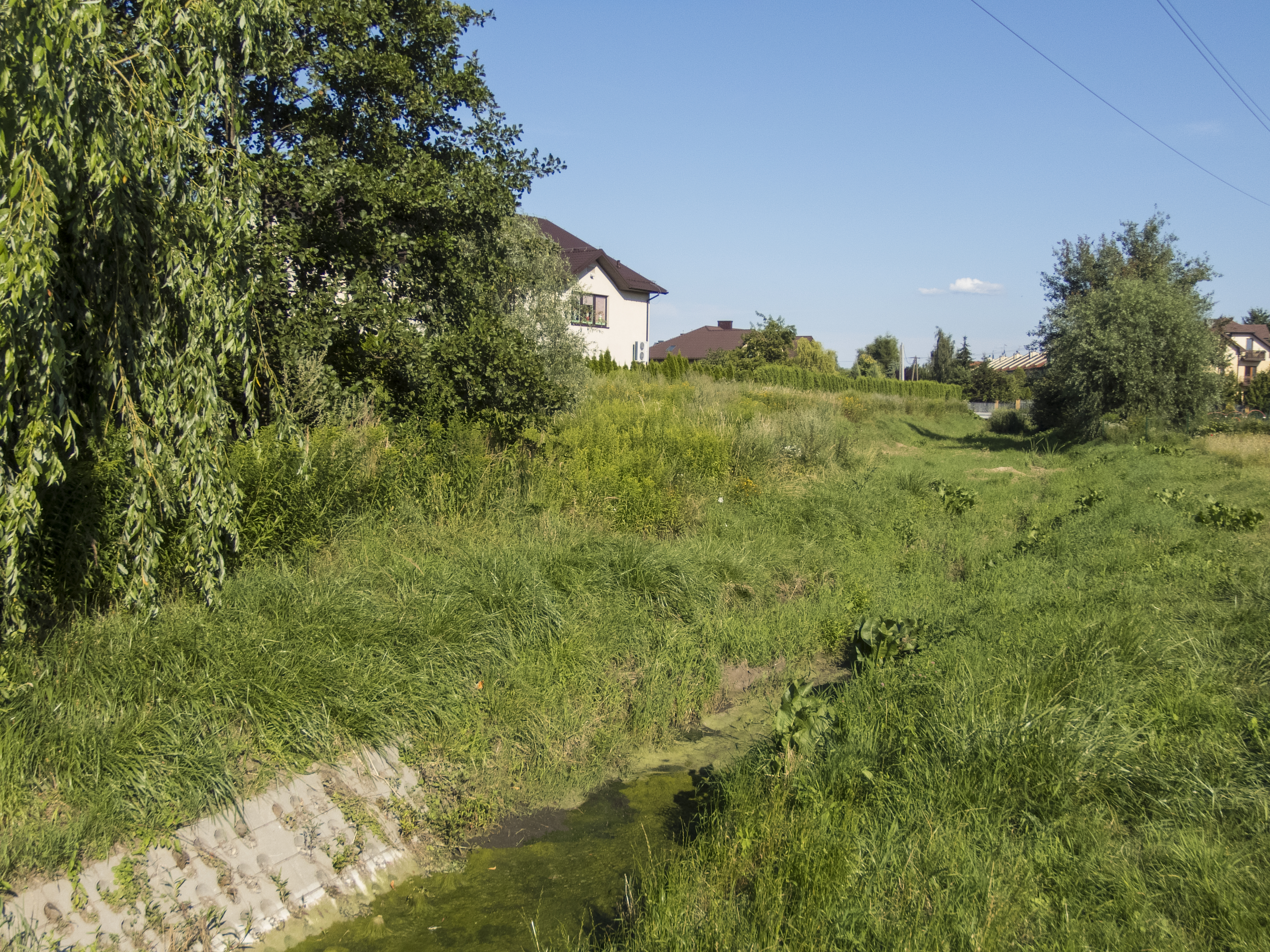
Jeziorki Ditch in Józefosław, near Cyraneczki Street, view from the southeast

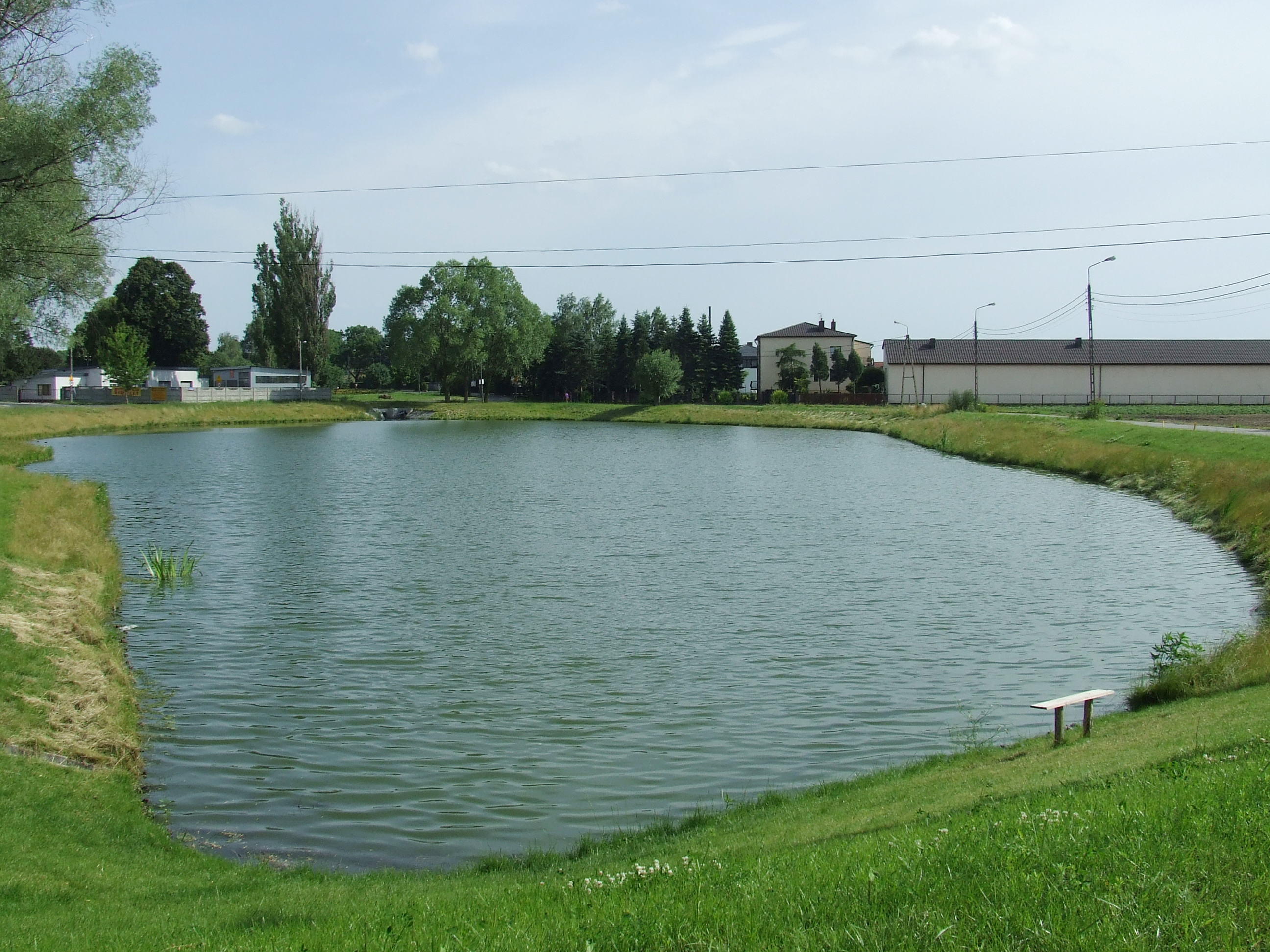
Pozytywka Pond in the Jeziorki Ditch drainage basin, reclaimed to increase retention capacity, potentially part of the ditch's course

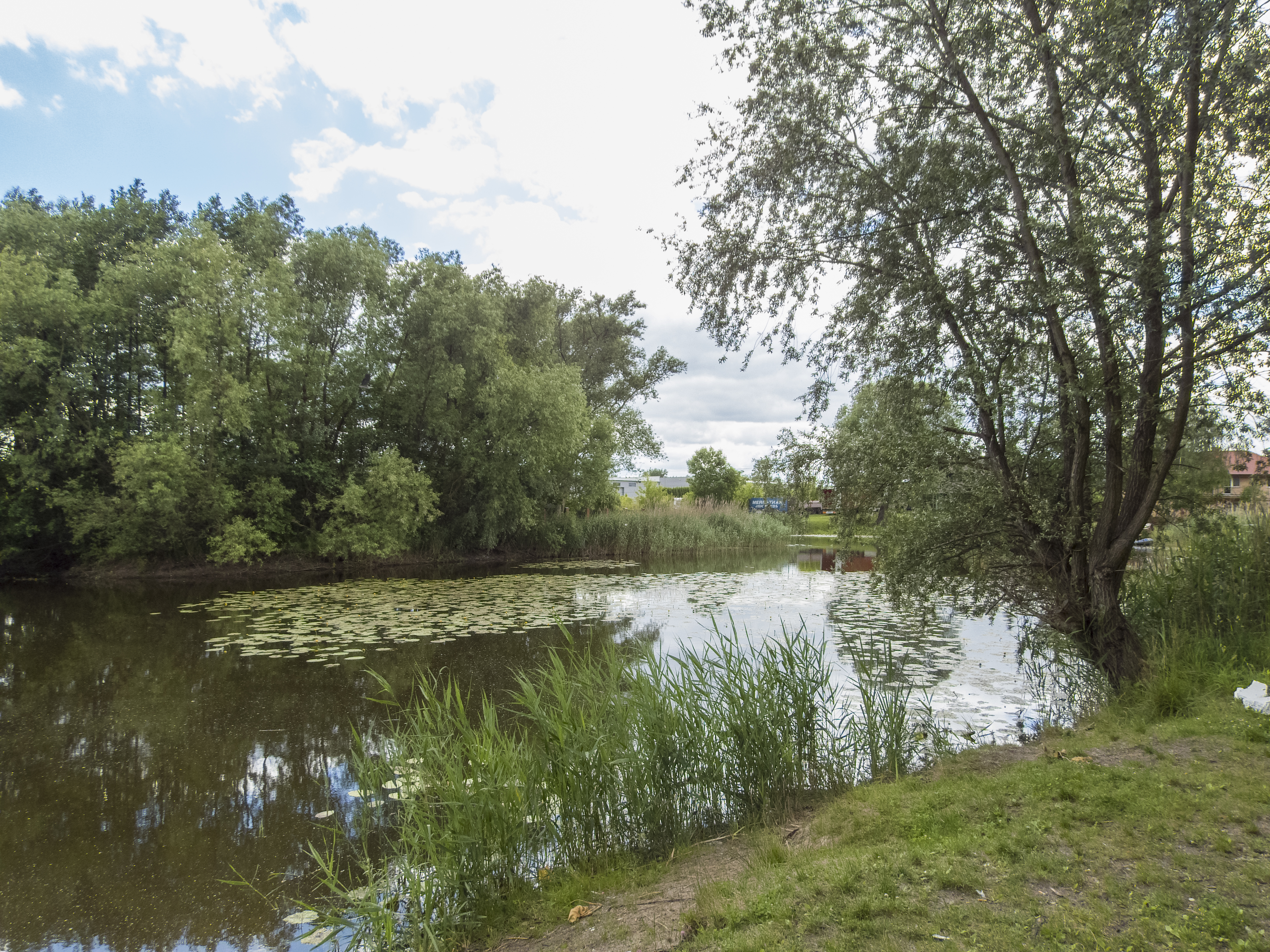
Czyste Pond in the Jeziorki Ditch drainage basin, reclaimed to increase retention capacity
