= Jeziorka (river) =

River in Poland

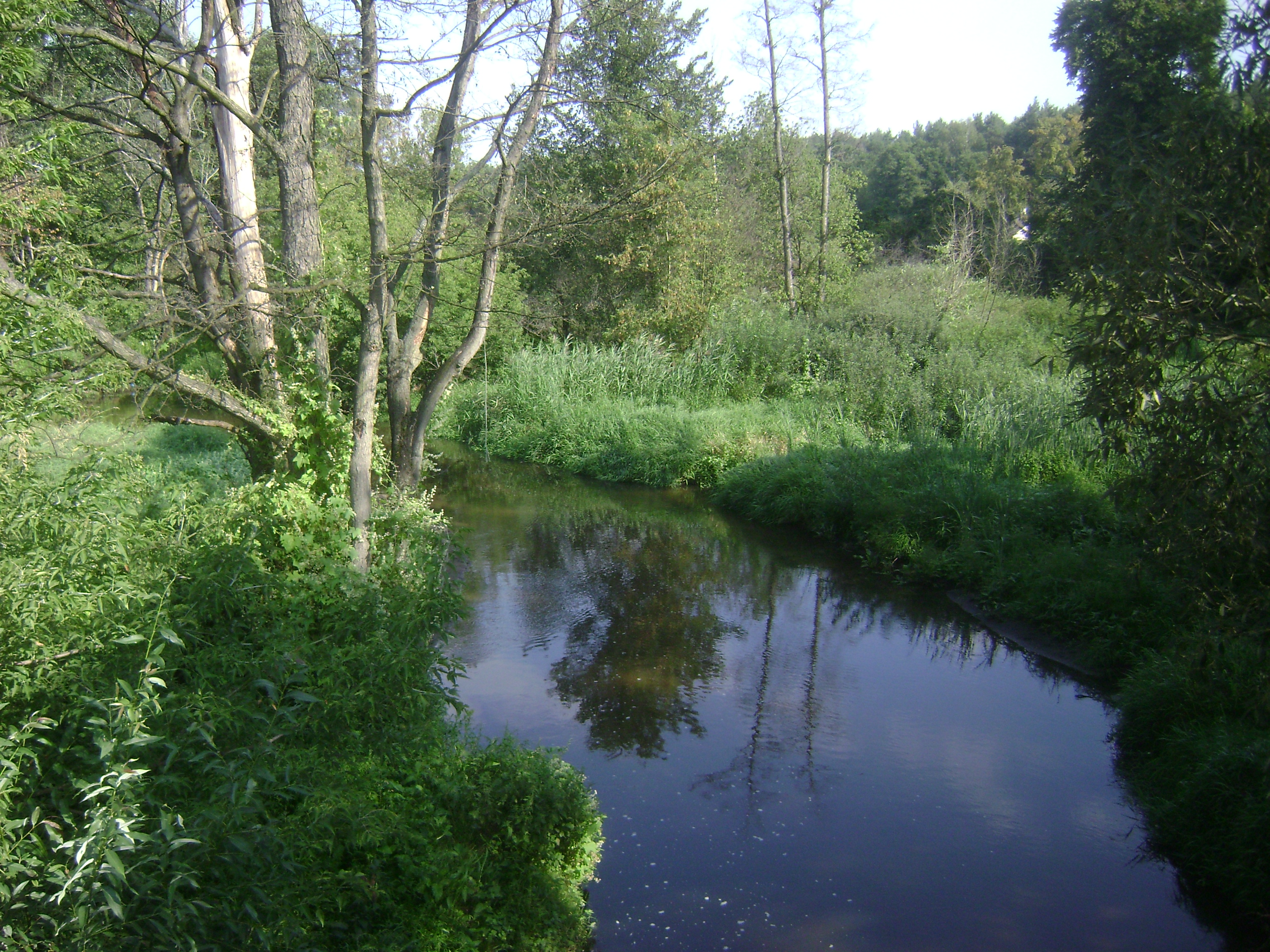
- Jerziorka river

Location
- Country: Poland

Physical characteristics
- Source
  - location: Dębiny Osuchowskie
  - coordinates: 51°54′01″N 20°37′00″E
- Mouth
  - location: Obórki
  - coordinates: 52.12°N 21.17°E

The Jeziorka River is a river in central Poland, a left tributary of the Vistula river with a length of 66 kilometers. It rises near the Dębiny Osuchowskie village, and enters the Vistula near Obórki village, close to Konstancin-Jeziorna.

The river passes through the villages of Głuchów, Prażmów, Żabieniec and Chyliczki along its course towards the Vistula.

== Geography ==
The Jeziorka and the Nowy Rów stream flow through the Odra River Valley and share an analogous catchment area. The Nowy Rów is a tributary of the Jerziorka.

Initially, the river flows east, turns north in Gościeńczyce, and turns east again near Jazgarzew. In its upper course, on a section of several kilometers from the village of Wygnanka to the village of Wilczoruda, the river flows through fish ponds dug in its bed. It crosses the ponds in Żabieniec, where it has been supplied with water from the Czarna Canal since 1973. The Mała stream flows into the Jeziorka at Konstancin-Jeziorna. In the last section, it crosses the Wilanówka stream, which flows under Jeziorka through a culvert and does not flow into it. The Jeziorka enters the Vistula near Obórki village, about 6 kilometres (4 mi) north-east of Konstancin-Jeziorna.
