= Cieciszew =

- Village
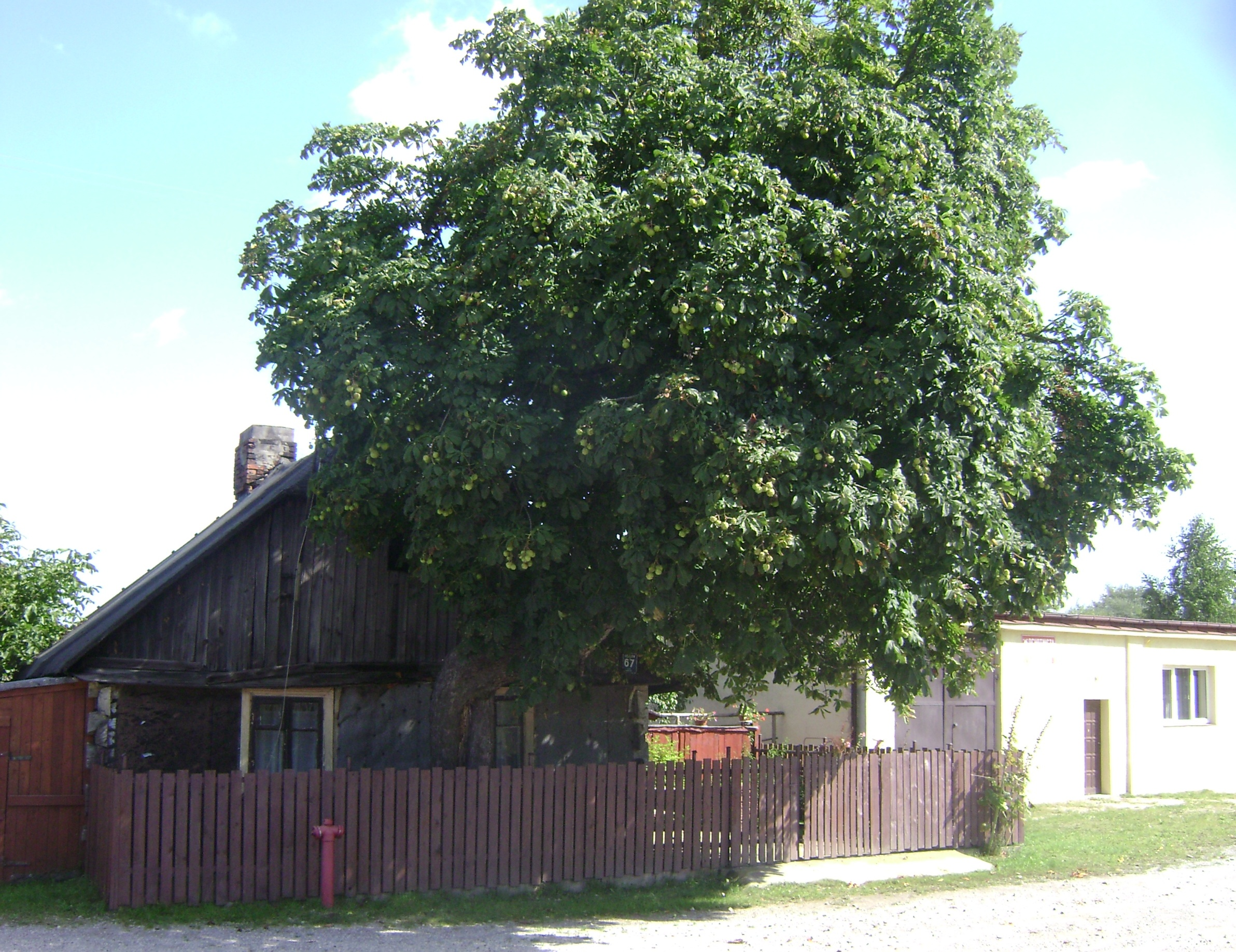

- Location within Poland
- Coordinates: 52°03′37″N 21°10′32″E
- Country: Poland
- Voivodeship: Masovian
- County: Piaseczno
- Gmina: Konstancin-Jeziorna

Cieciszew [t͡ɕɛˈt͡ɕiʂɛf] is a village in the administrative district of Gmina Konstancin-Jeziorna, within Piaseczno County, Masovian Voivodeship, in east-central Poland.

== History ==
Cieciszew was established in the Early Middle Ages on a peninsula beside the Vistula; the site now lies beside an oxbow lake. Its name is derived from the personal name Ciecisz or Ciecirad.

The local topography and the village's circular layout suggest that a fortified settlement once stood there. A parish was founded and a church was built in 1236; the church's foundations remain buried within the village. By 1253, Cieciszew was a ducal settlement where privileges were issued. The stronghold was probably built near a Vistula crossing and initially served defensive and guard functions.

In 1353, the village belonged to Stanisław Pierzchała. By then, changes in the river's course had left it beside an oxbow lake rather than the main channel. Sources repeatedly mention the village and its parish between the 14th and 17th centuries. Its position on a route and the presence of a church made it one of the larger settlements in the surrounding estates. The village belonged to the Cieciszewski family; by the 16th century, it had a manor house and a brewery near the Vistula oxbow.

In 1603, the church's endowment included tithes from nearby villages.

In the 17th century, the village was known as Cieciszewo Kościelne and, from the middle of the century, belonged to the Wielopolski family. The church was rebuilt three times after fires, flood damage and destruction during the Swedish wars. Flooding between 1710 and 1715 destroyed part of the village and the parish church, which was relocated and rebuilt in Słomczyn.

From 1806 until the emancipation of the peasants, Cieciszew belonged to the Potulicki family. In 1827, it had 193 inhabitants living in 25 houses. The 1921 census recorded 310 inhabitants and 41 houses.

In 2007, a Varangian hacksilver hoard was discovered in fields near Cieciszew. It contained fragments of silver dirhams minted in Samarkand during the reign of Nasr II and dated to between 913 and 942.

Scenes for the Polish television series Złotopolscy were filmed in Cieciszew between 1998 and 2010, including scenes set in Karabasz's shop, later Kleczkowska's shop, and at the home of MP Biernacki.

Traditional Cieciszew cheeses are produced in the village. Their producers participate in the Mazovia Culinary Heritage network.
