= Słomczyn =

Słomczyn can refer to two different villages in the Mazovian Voivodeship, Poland:

- Słomczyn, Grójec County
- Słomczyn, Piaseczno County
