= Czarnów, Piaseczno County =

Czarnów
- Village
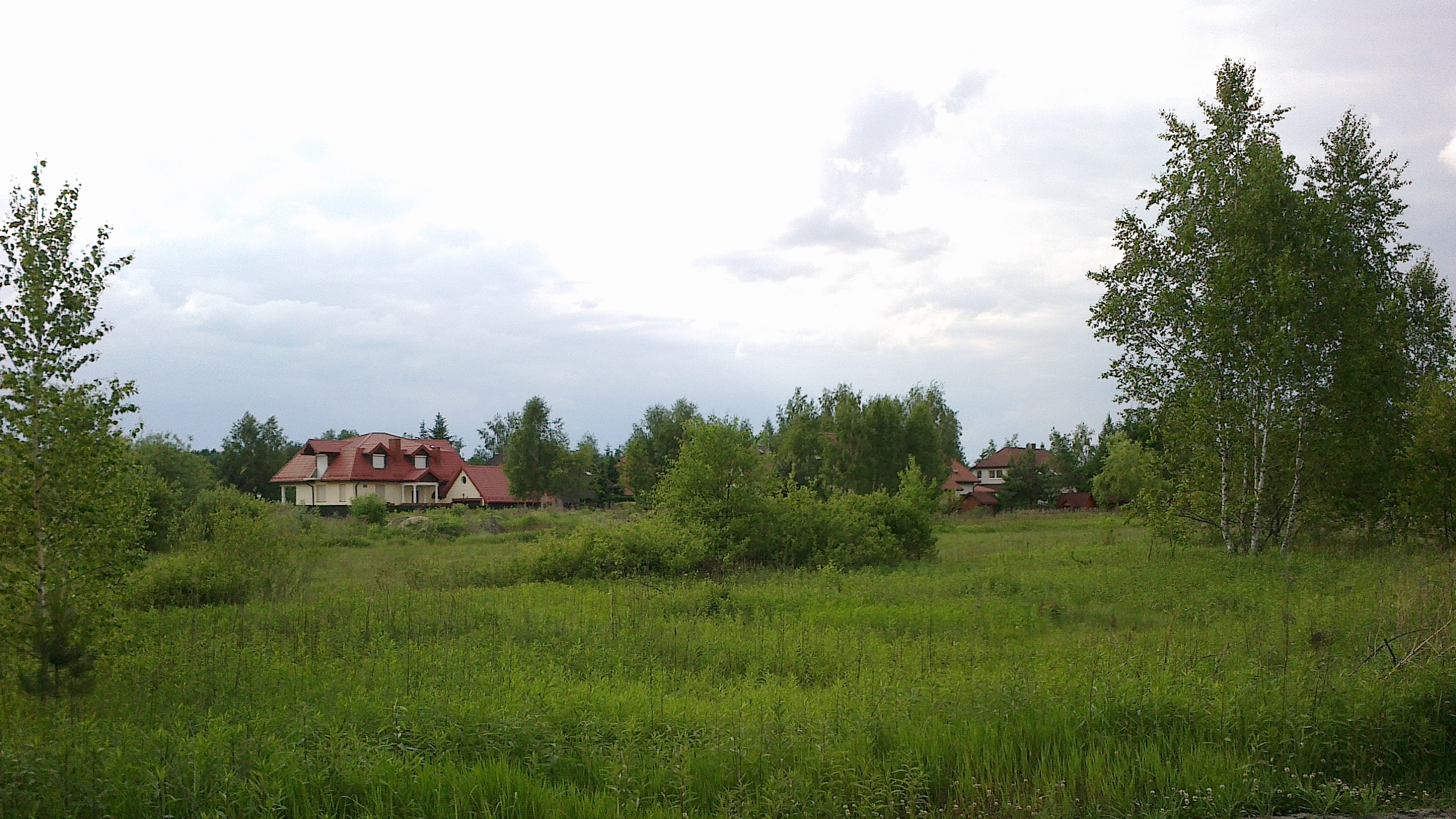

- Location within Poland
- Coordinates: 52°4′N 21°6′E
- Country: Poland
- Voivodeship: Masovian
- County: Piaseczno
- Gmina: Konstancin-Jeziorna

Czarnów [ˈt͡ʂarnuf] is a village in the administrative district of Gmina Konstancin-Jeziorna, within Piaseczno County, Masovian Voivodeship, in east-central Poland.
