= Obory, Piaseczno County =

Obory
- Village
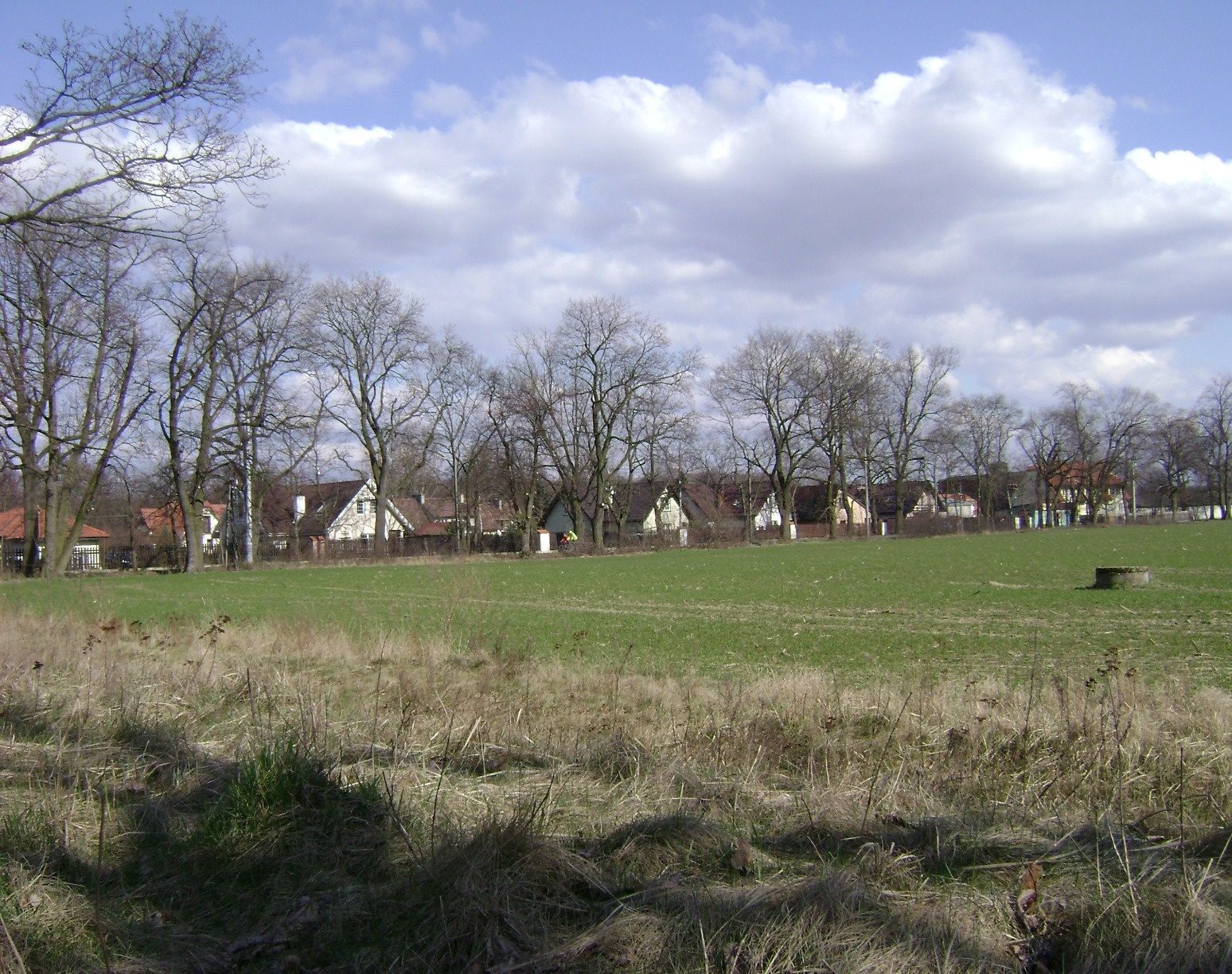

- Location within Poland
- Coordinates: 52°4′54″N 21°8′54″E
- Country: Poland
- Voivodeship: Masovian
- County: Piaseczno
- Gmina: Konstancin-Jeziorna

Obory [ɔˈbɔrɨ] is a village in the administrative district of Gmina Konstancin-Jeziorna, within Piaseczno County, Masovian Voivodeship, in east-central Poland.
