= Parcela-Obory =

- Village
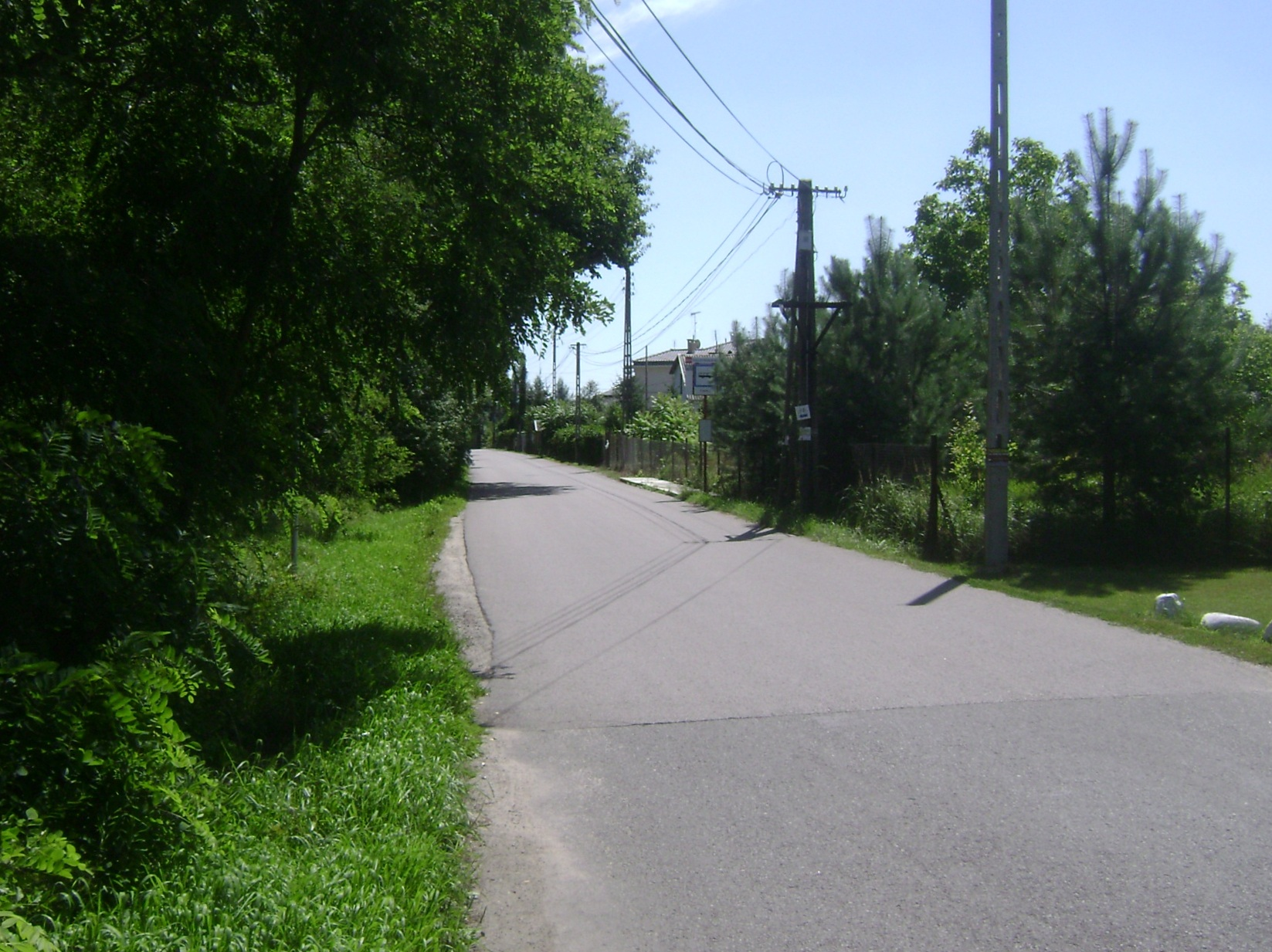

- Location within Poland
- Coordinates: 52°04′25″N 21°09′15″E
- Country: Poland
- Voivodeship: Masovian
- County: Piaseczno
- Gmina: Konstancin-Jeziorna

Parcela-Obory [parˈt͡sɛla ɔˈbɔrɨ] is a village in the administrative district of Gmina Konstancin-Jeziorna, within Piaseczno County, Masovian Voivodeship, in east-central Poland, 23 km (14 mi) away from Warsaw.
