= Kawęczyn, Gmina Konstancin-Jeziorna =

Kawęczyn
- Village
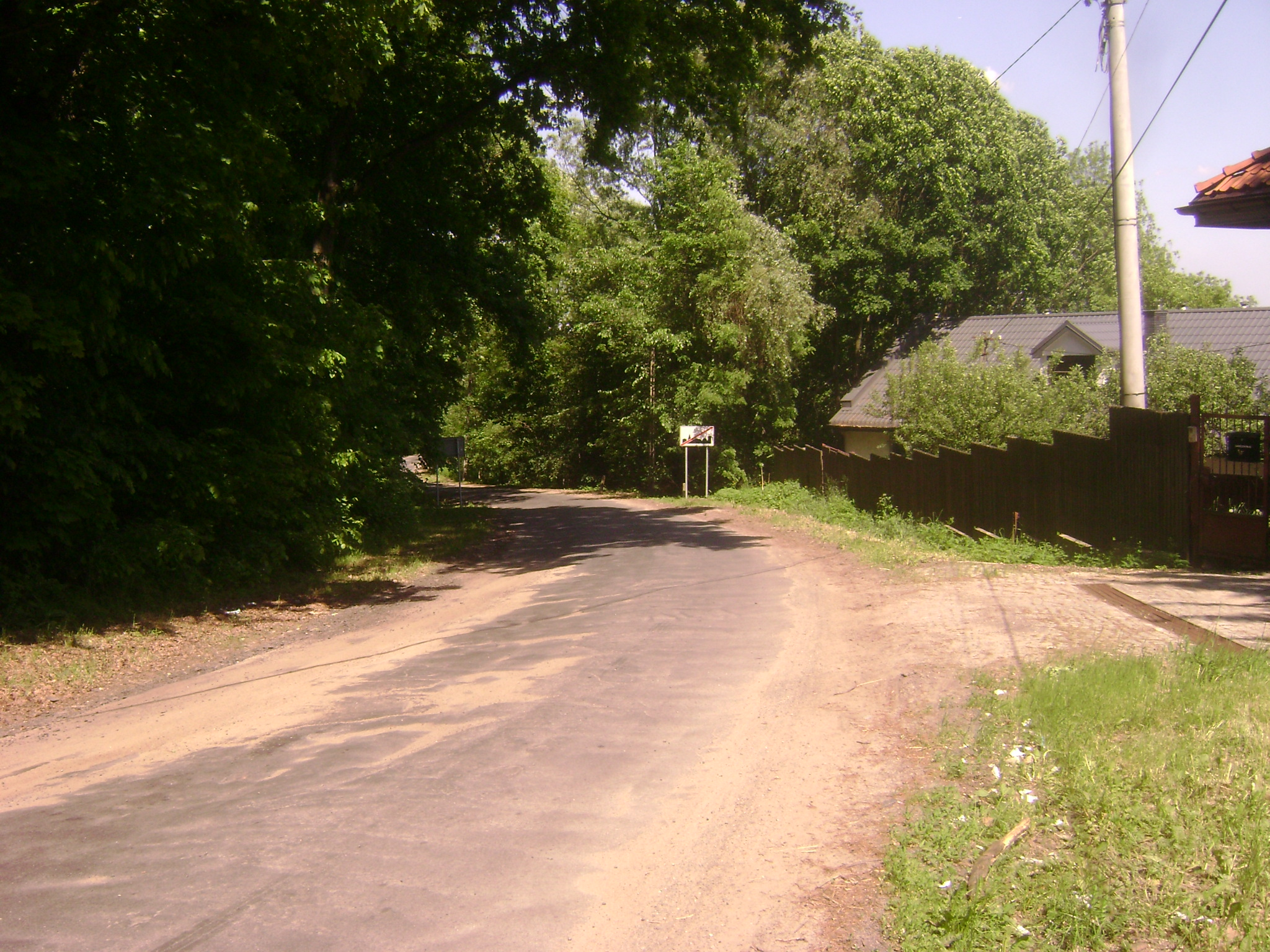

- Location within Poland
- Coordinates: 52°2′42″N 21°10′25″E
- Country: Poland
- Voivodeship: Masovian
- County: Piaseczno
- Gmina: Konstancin-Jeziorna

Population
  - Total: 400

Kawęczyn [kaˈvɛnt͡ʂɨn] is a village in the administrative district of Gmina Konstancin-Jeziorna, within Piaseczno County, Masovian Voivodeship, in east-central Poland.
