= Łęg, Piaseczno County =

Łęg
- Village
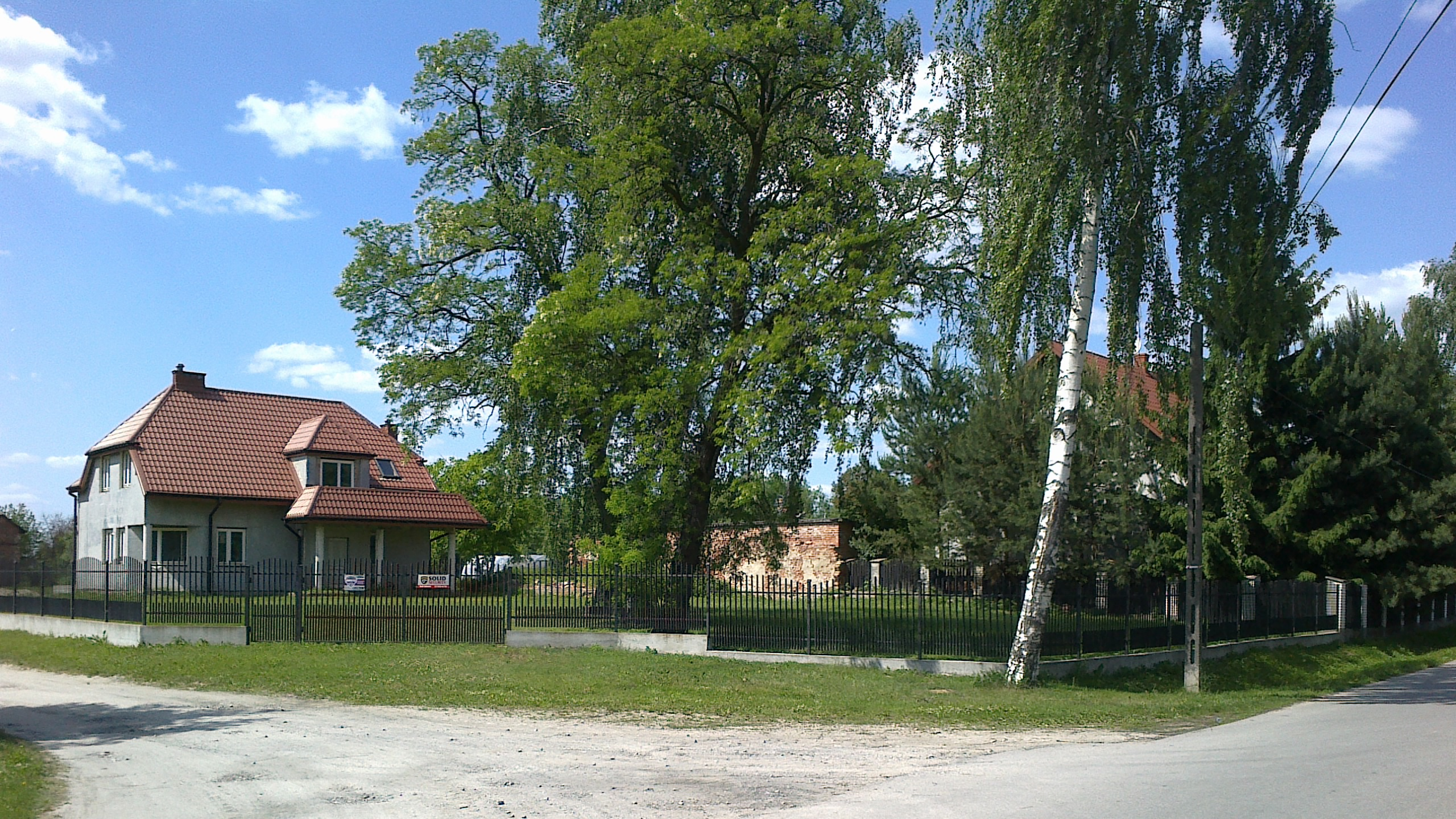

- Location within Poland
- Coordinates: 52°5′N 21°11′E
- Country: Poland
- Voivodeship: Masovian
- County: Piaseczno
- Gmina: Konstancin-Jeziorna

Łęg [wɛnk] is a village in the administrative district of Gmina Konstancin-Jeziorna, within Piaseczno County, Masovian Voivodeship, in east-central Poland.
