= Kawęczynek, Masovian Voivodeship =

Kawęczynek
- Village
- Location within Poland
- Coordinates: 52°3′N 21°9′E
- Country: Poland
- Voivodeship: Masovian
- County: Piaseczno
- Gmina: Konstancin-Jeziorna

Kawęczynek [kavɛnˈt͡ʂɨnɛk] is a village in the administrative district of Gmina Konstancin-Jeziorna, within Piaseczno County, Masovian Voivodeship, in east-central Poland.
