= Borowina, Piaseczno County =

Borowina
- Village
- Location within Poland
- Coordinates: 52°3′9″N 21°6′56″E
- Country: Poland
- Voivodeship: Masovian
- County: Piaseczno
- Gmina: Konstancin-Jeziorna

Borowina [bɔrɔˈvina] (English: mud) is a village in the administrative district of Gmina Konstancin-Jeziorna, within Piaseczno County, Masovian Voivodeship, in east-central Poland.
