= Kępa Okrzewska =

- Village
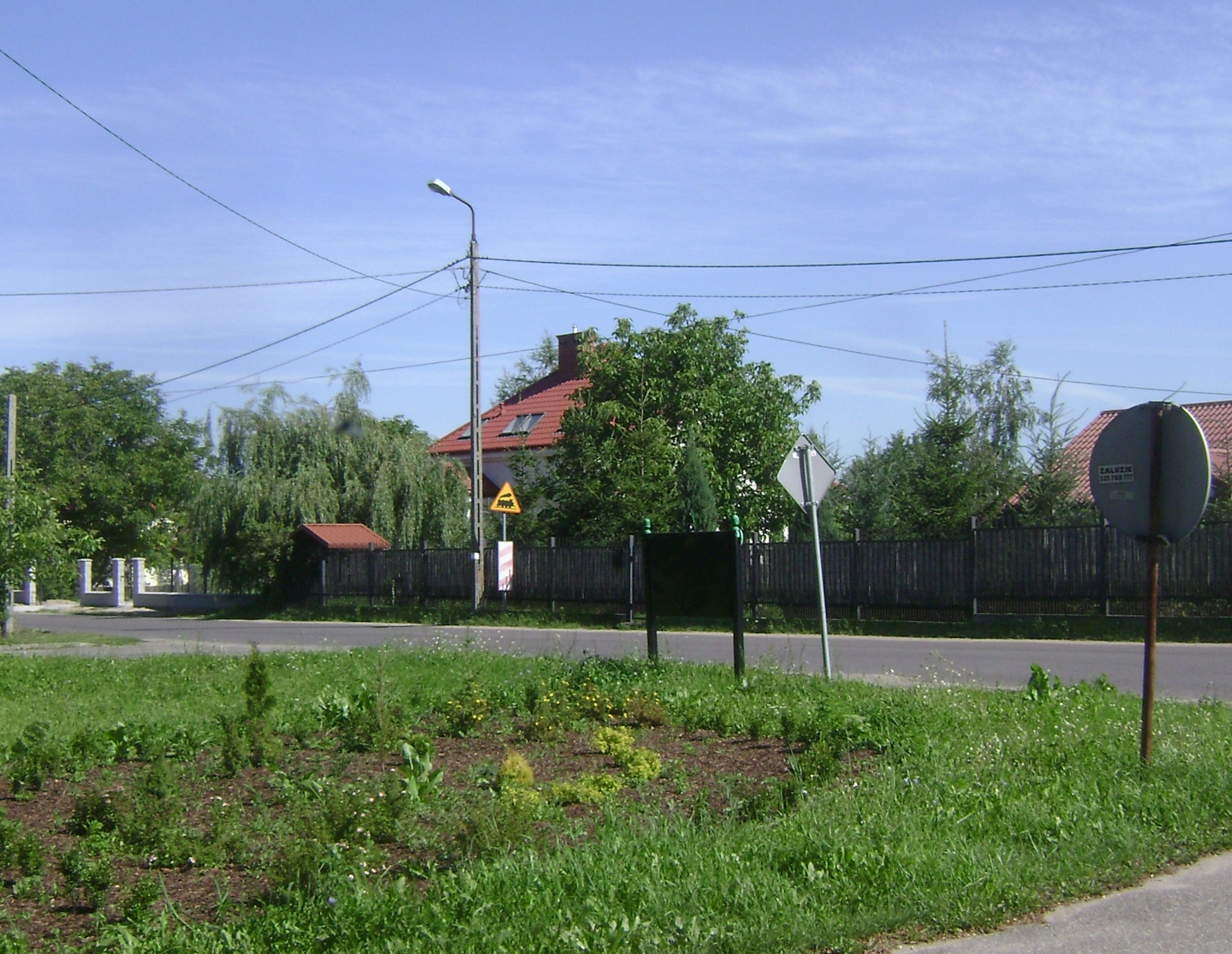

- Location within Poland
- Coordinates: 52°8′7″N 21°9′11″E
- Country: Poland
- Voivodeship: Masovian
- County: Piaseczno
- Gmina: Konstancin-Jeziorna
- Time zone: UTC+1 (CET)
  - Summer (DST): UTC+2 (CEST)
- Vehicle registration: WPI

Kępa Okrzewska [ˈkɛmpa ɔˈkʂɛfska] is a village in the administrative district of Gmina Konstancin-Jeziorna, within Piaseczno County, Masovian Voivodeship, in the Warsaw metropolitan area, in east-central Poland.
