= Opacz =

- Village
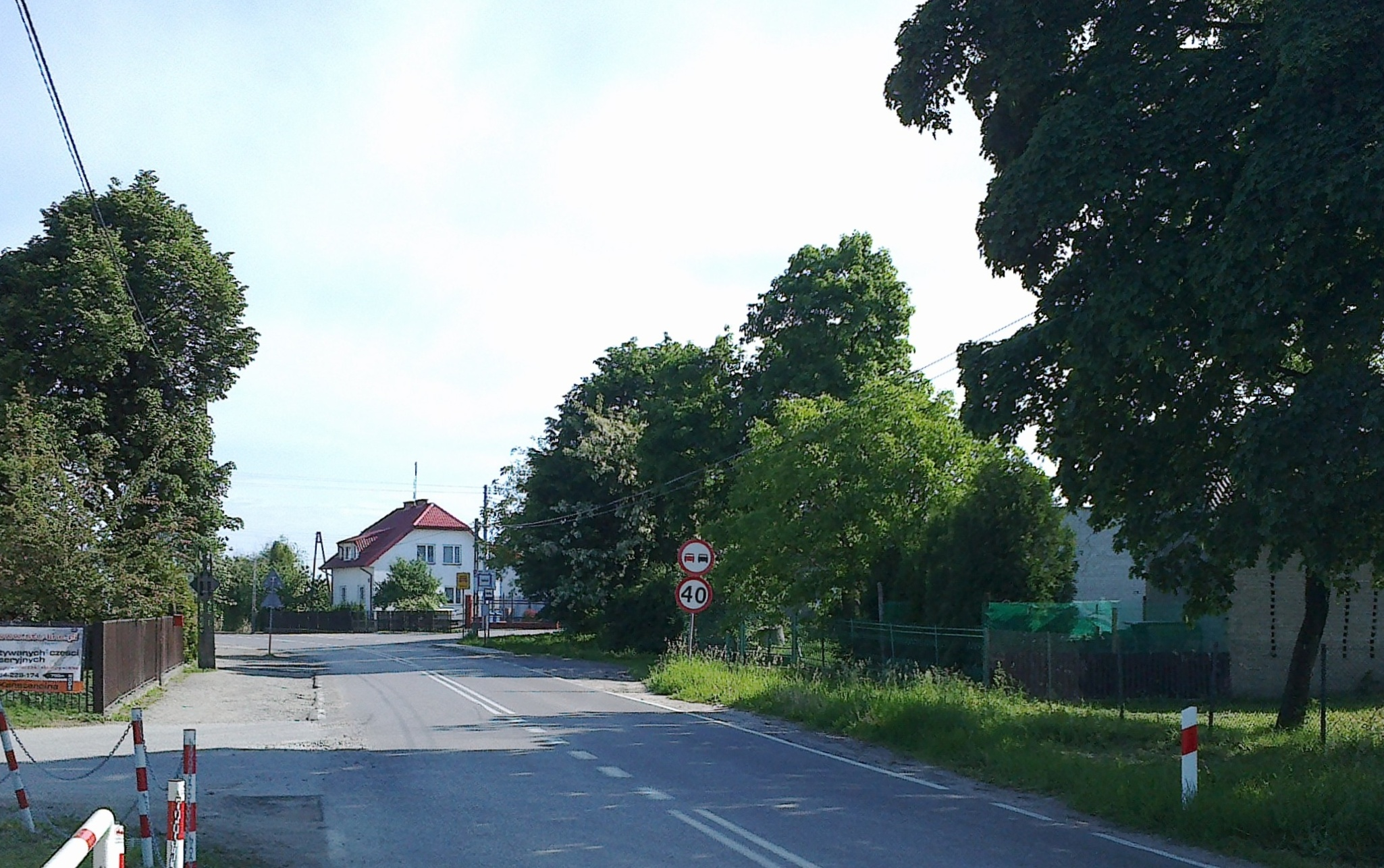

- Location within Poland
- Coordinates: 52°6′N 21°10′E
- Country: Poland
- Voivodeship: Masovian
- County: Piaseczno
- Gmina: Konstancin-Jeziorna

Population
  - Total: 399
- Time zone: UTC+1 (CET)
  - Summer (DST): UTC+2 (CEST)

Opacz [ˈɔpat͡ʂ] is a village in the administrative district of Gmina Konstancin-Jeziorna, within Piaseczno County, Masovian Voivodeship, in east-central Poland.

One Polish citizen was murdered by Nazi Germany in the village during World War II.
