= Turowice, Piaseczno County =

Turowice, Poland
- Village
- Location within Poland
- Coordinates: 52°3′N 21°10′E
- Country: Poland
- Voivodeship: Masovian
- County: Piaseczno
- Gmina: Konstancin-Jeziorna

Turowice [turɔˈvit͡sɛ] is a village in the administrative district of Gmina Konstancin-Jeziorna, within Piaseczno County, Masovian Voivodeship, in east-central Poland.
