= Habdzin =

- Village
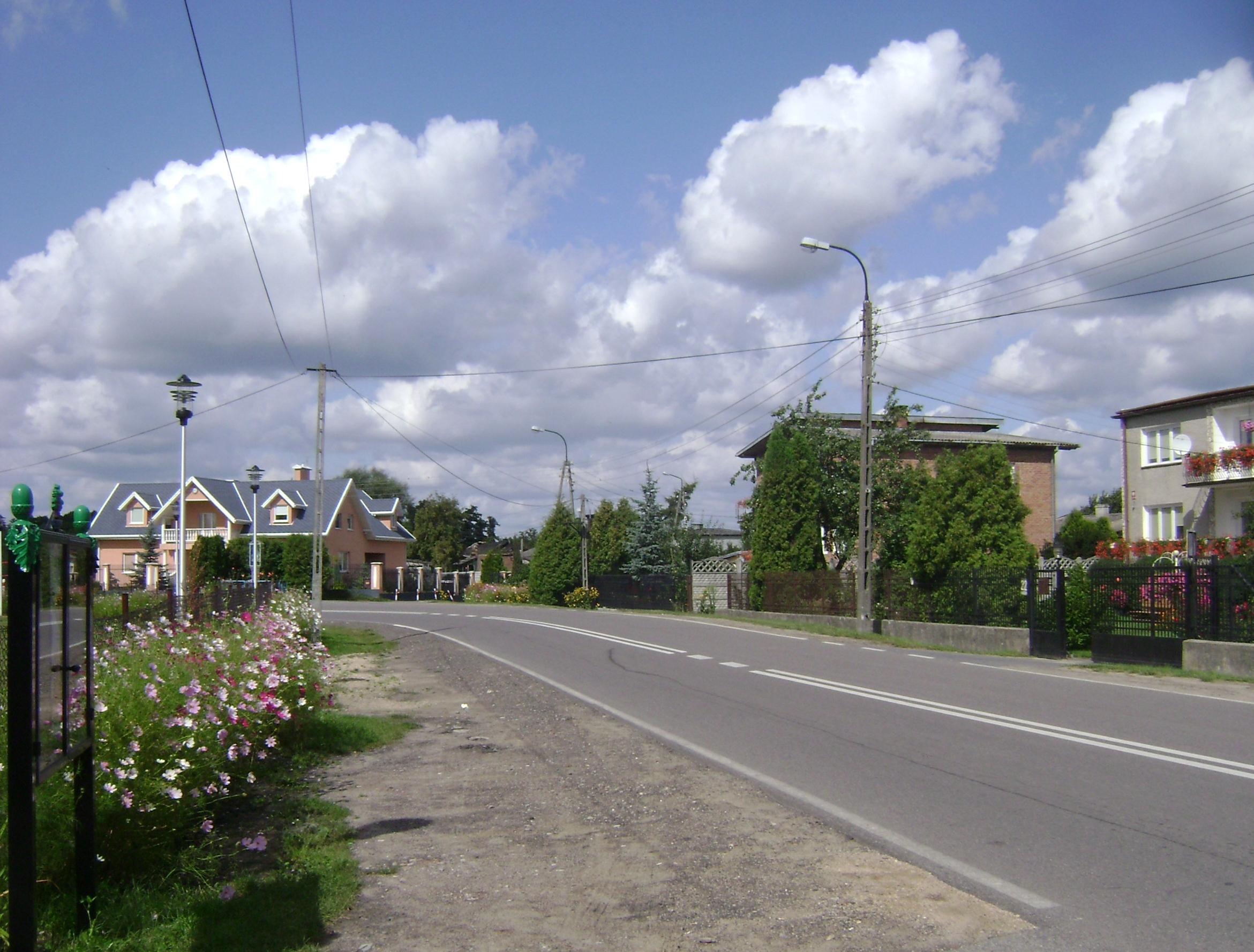
- Houses in Habdzin

- Location within Poland
- Coordinates: 52°5′30″N 21°9′34″E
- Country: Poland
- Voivodeship: Masovian
- County: Piaseczno
- Gmina: Konstancin-Jeziorna
- Website: http://www.habdzin.pl

Habdzin [ˈxabd͡ʑin] is a village in the administrative district of Gmina Konstancin-Jeziorna, within Piaseczno County, Masovian Voivodeship, in east-central Poland.
