= Czernidła =

Village in Gmina Konstancin-Jeziorna, Poland

- Village
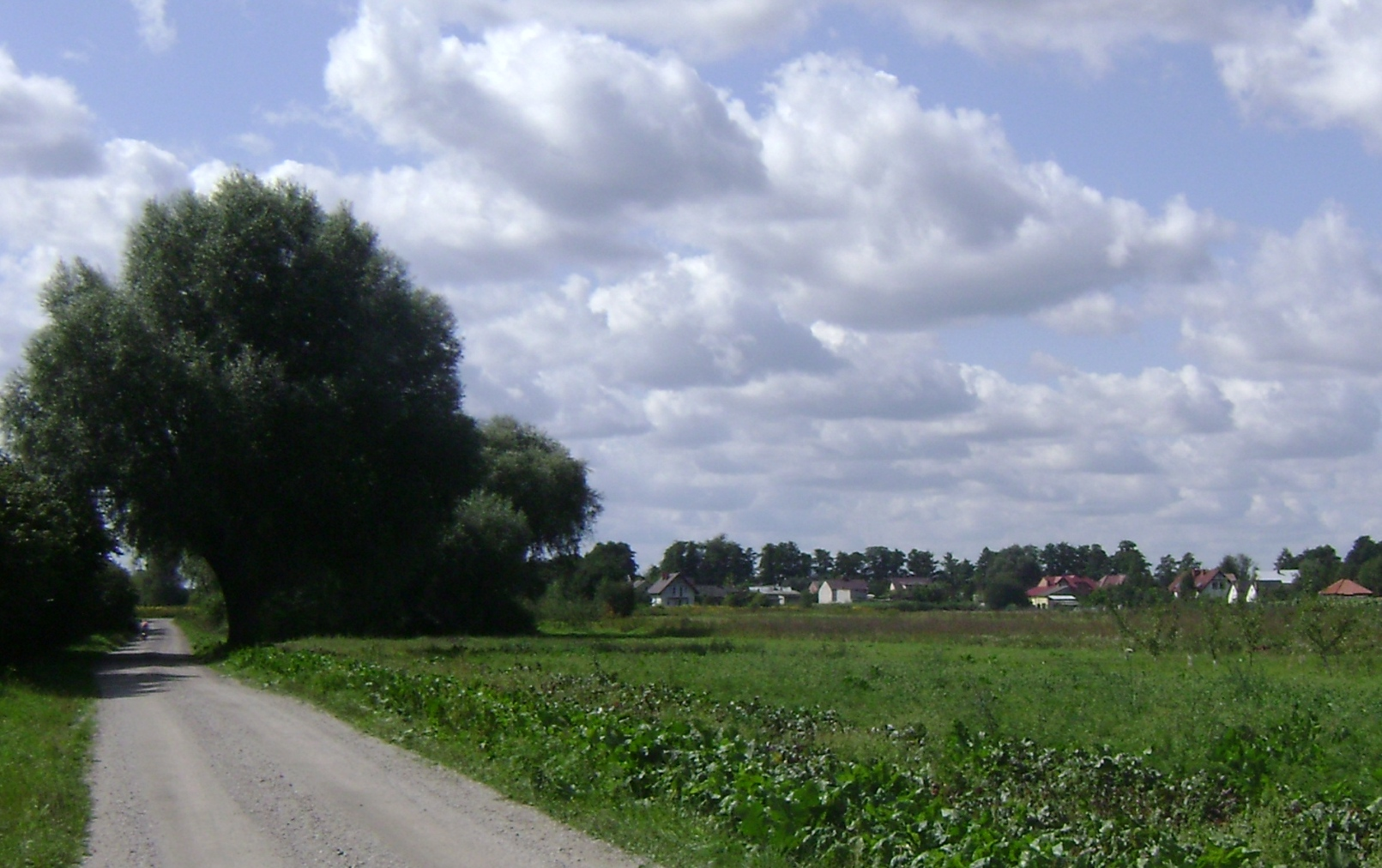

- Location within Poland
- Coordinates: 52°5′18″N 21°11′27″E
- Country: Poland
- Voivodeship: Masovian
- County: Piaseczno
- Gmina: Konstancin-Jeziorna

Czernidła [t͡ʂɛrˈnidwa] is a village in the administrative district of Gmina Konstancin-Jeziorna, within Piaseczno County, Masovian Voivodeship, in east-central Poland.
