= Ciszyca, Masovian Voivodeship =

Ciszyca
- Village
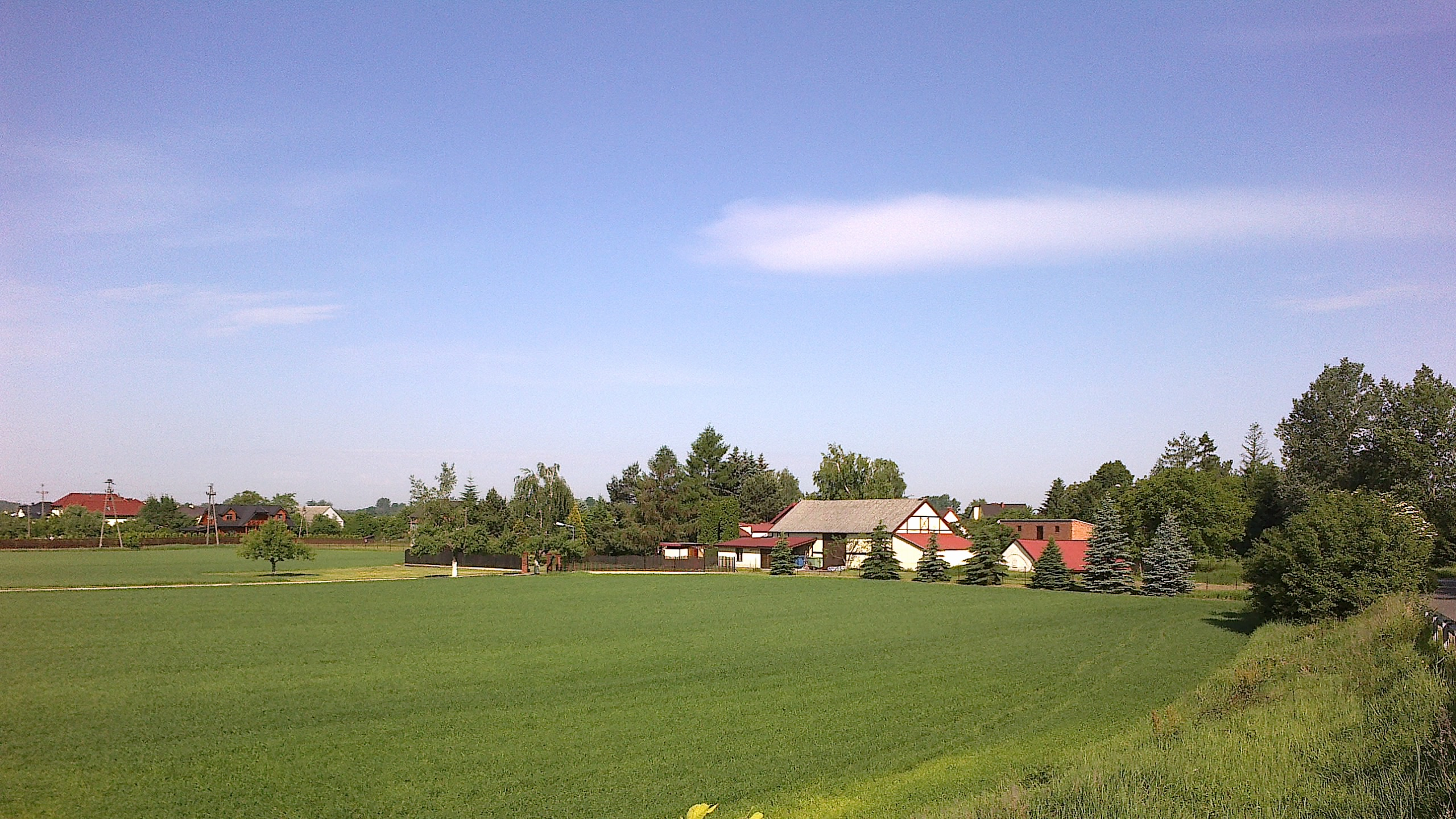

- Location within Poland
- Coordinates: 52°6′35″N 21°11′12″E
- Country: Poland
- Voivodeship: Masovian
- County: Piaseczno
- Gmina: Konstancin-Jeziorna
- Time zone: UTC+1 (CET)
  - Summer (DST): UTC+2 (CEST)

Ciszyca [t͡ɕiˈʂɨt͡sa] is a village in the administrative district of Gmina Konstancin-Jeziorna, within Piaseczno County, Masovian Voivodeship, in east-central Poland.

Nine Polish citizens were murdered by Nazi Germany in the village during World War II.
