= Nowa Wola, Piaseczno County =

Nowa Wola
- Village
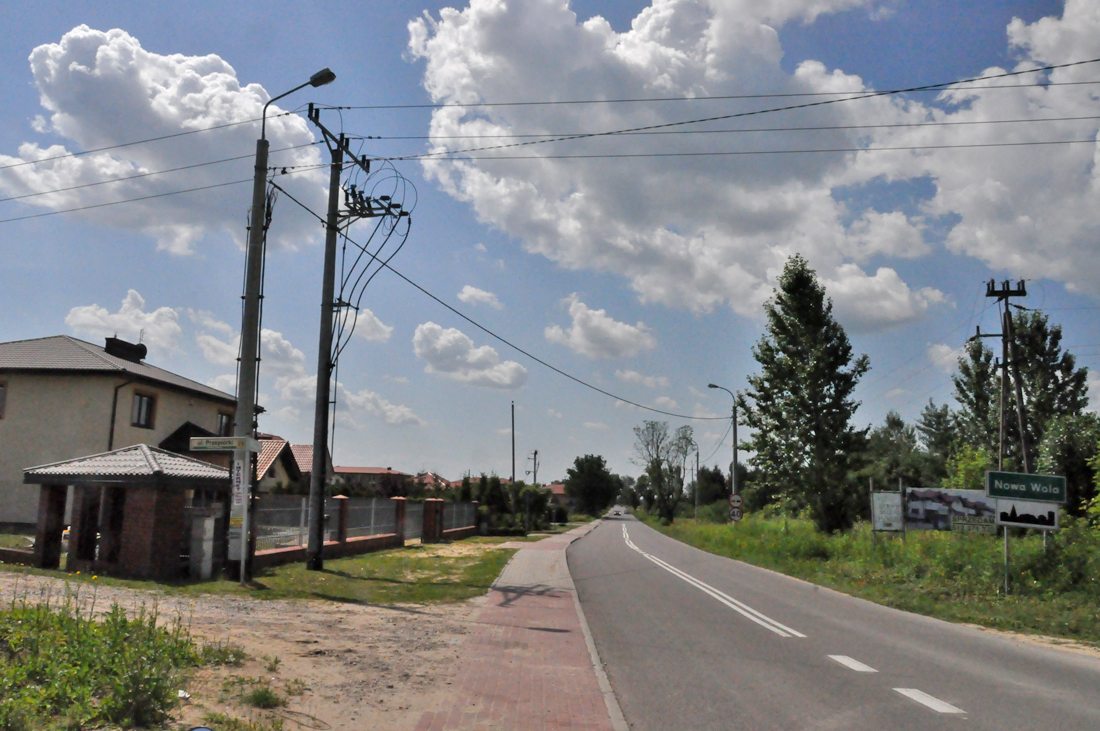

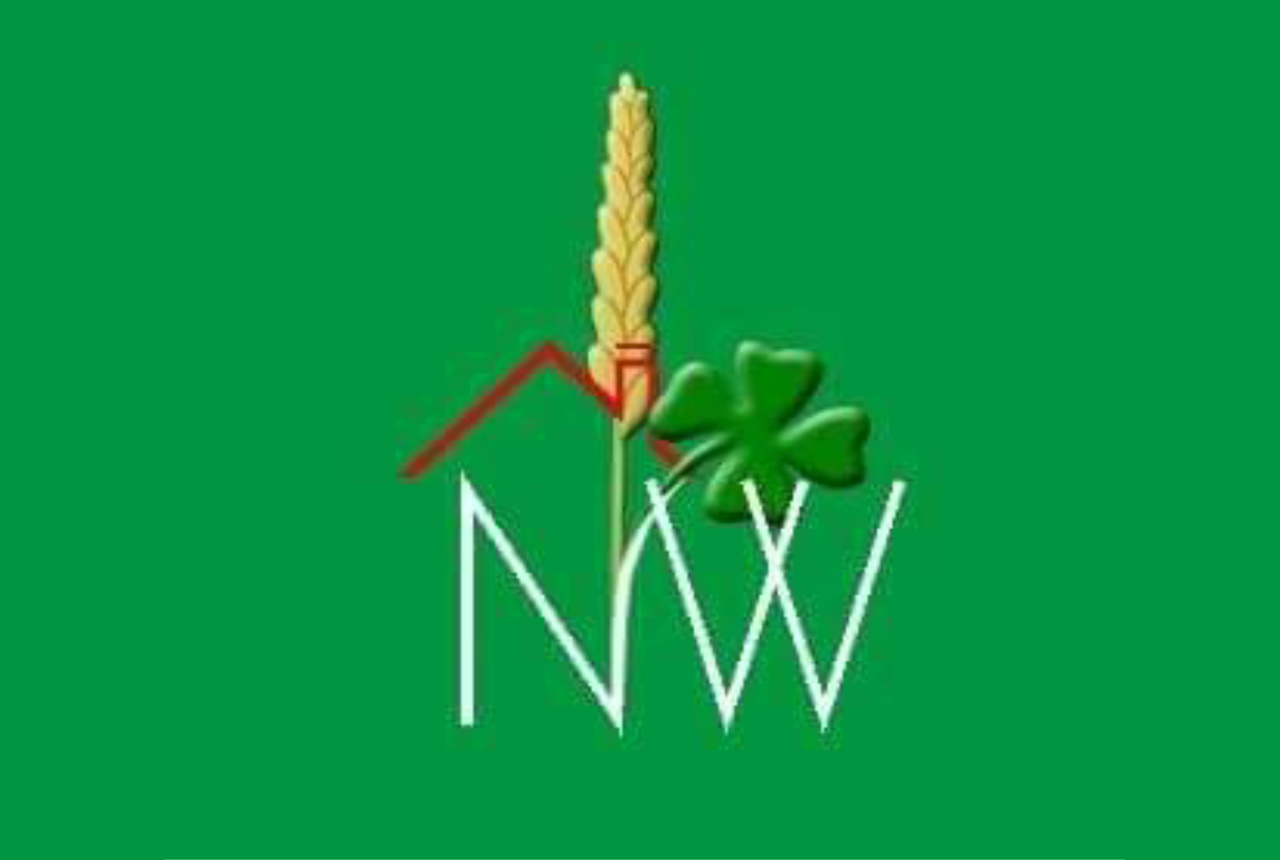
- Flag

- Location within Poland
- Coordinates: 52°5′33″N 20°58′19″E
- Country: Poland
- Voivodeship: Masovian
- County: Piaseczno
- Gmina: Lesznowola
- Time zone: UTC+1 (CET)
  - Summer (DST): UTC+2 (CEST)
- Vehicle registration: WPI
- Primary airport: Warsaw Chopin Airport

Nowa Wola [ˈnɔva ˈvɔla] is a small village in the administrative district of Gmina Lesznowola, within Piaseczno County, Masovian Voivodeship, in the Warsaw metropolitan area, in east-central Poland.

== History ==
Six Polish citizens were murdered by Nazi Germany in the village during World War II.
