= Mała Wisełka =

Mała Wisełka Polska Wisła, Mała Wisła
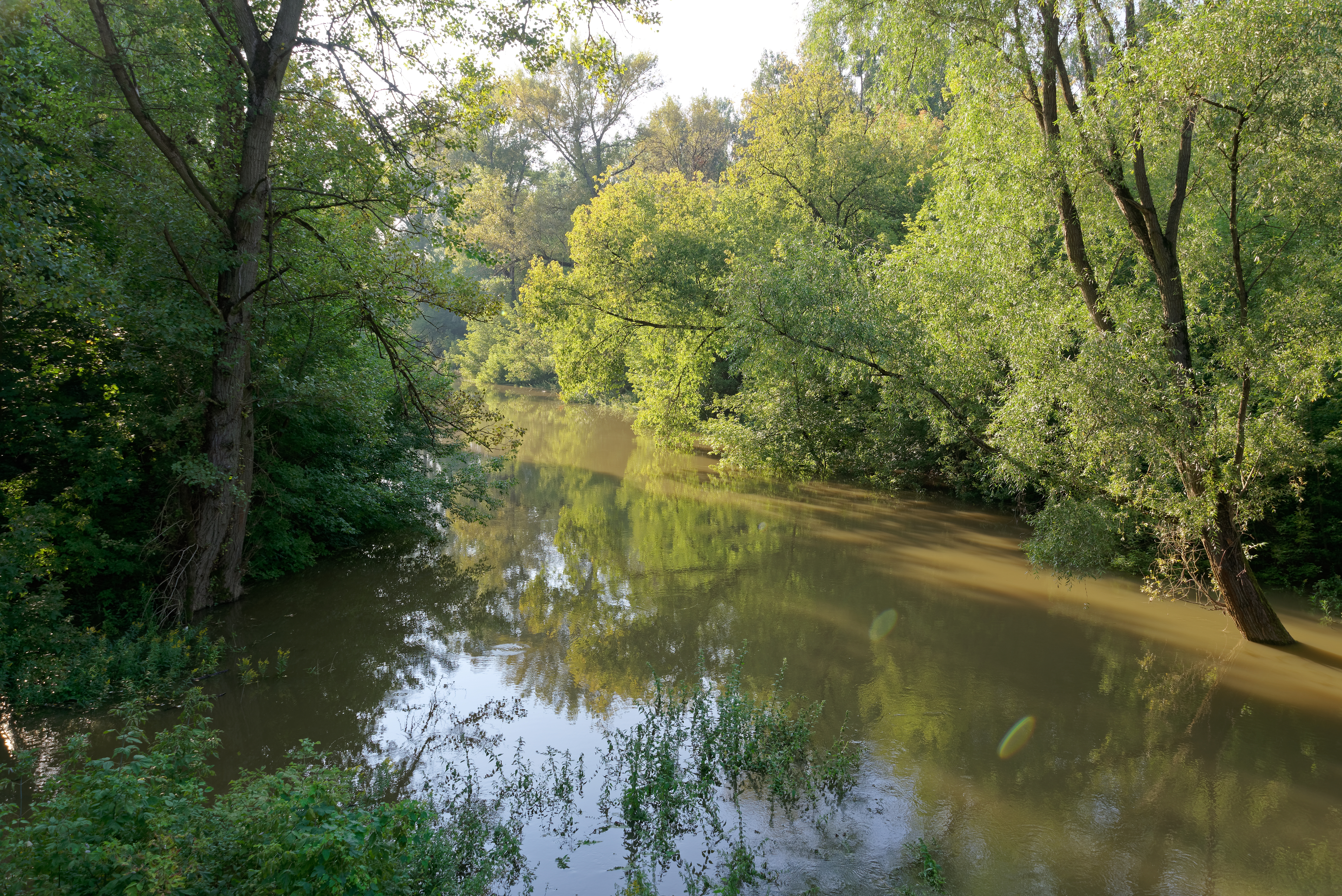
- Mała Wisełka in September

Location
- Country: Poland

Physical characteristics
- Source
  - elevation: 36m
- Mouth
  - location: Vistula
  - coordinates: 53°0′9″N 18°35′51″E
- Length: 3 km (1.9 mi)

Basin features
- Progression: Vistula→ Baltic Sea

Mała Wisełka (the former Polska Wisła, German: Polnische Weichsel) is a branch of the Vistula river in the town of Toruń in Poland. It translates literally from Polish as very small Vistula.

The Vistula and the Mała Wisełka are forming the island Kępa Bazarowa (German: Bazar-Kämpe).

== History ==
The forking of the Vistula (Wisła) into its distributaries the main stream and the Small Vistula (Mała Wisła or Wisełka) created 16 small islands (German: Kämpe, Polish: kęp) like Kępa Bazarowa, Liszka, Winnicza Góra, Białkowa, Wszowka, Cegielniana, Strońska, Starotoruńska, Krowaniec, Grodzisko, Korzeniec und Kępa Zielona. In February 1411 after the First Peace of Thorn, Kępa Bazarowa became the border between the Teutonic Knights in the north and the Kingdom of Poland in the south.

Since 1500, the wooden German Bridge was leading from the Bridge Gate (Brama Mostowa) of Toruń to Kępa Bazarowa. The Polish Bridge was crossing the Polish Vistula (Polska Wisła). The length of the bridges had been 220 and 339 meters. The wooden German bridge to the island was destroyed in 1877 and replaced by a steam ferry.

The Vistula was regulated in the 19th century. Some meanders are left and became oxbow lakes. Kępa Bazarowa and Kępa Zielona grew together and are now the last island in the area of Toruń. The Polish Vistula became the small Mała Wisełka. The Protected Area (rezerwat leśny) for the riparian forest was established in 1987 with an area of 32.4 ha.

== Places ==
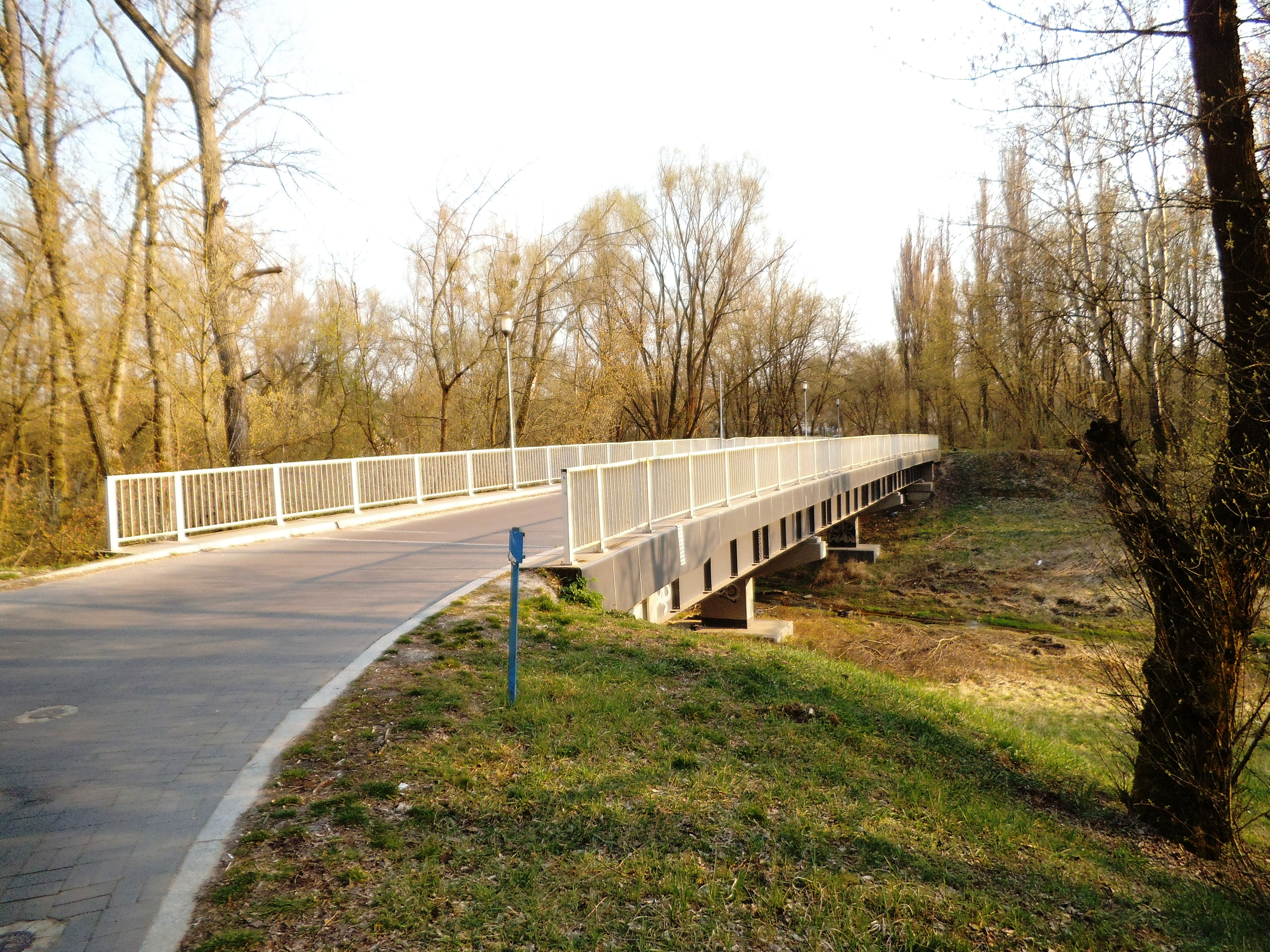
Bridge over the Mała Wisełka

The former hamlet on Kępa Bazarowa was called Majdany. In the 16th century, Podgórz on the southern bank got the rights as a town. Nowadays the eastern part of the Mała Wisełka is the border between the districts (dzielnica) Piaski and Rudak of the city of Toruń.

== Bridges ==
In interwar Poland the bridge over the Mała Wisełka was replaced by a modern bridge. It was renovated in 2015. In 1873, Johann Wilhelm Schwedler completed the combined road and railway bridge, nowadays as Ernest Malinowski Bridge leading the railway across the eastern part of the island and the Mała Wisełka. In 1934, the Józef Piłsudski Bridge was completed. The National road DK 15 is crossing the western tip of the island.
