= Gmina Konstancin-Jeziorna =

Gmina Konstancin-Jeziorna Konstancin-Jeziorna Commune
- Gmina
- Flag Coat of arms
- Interactive map of Gmina Konstancin-Jeziorna
- Coordinates (Konstancin-Jeziorna): 52°5′N 21°7′E
- Country: Poland
- Voivodeship: Masovian
- County: Piaseczno
- Seat: Konstancin-Jeziorna

Area
  - Total: 78.28 km^{2} (30.22 sq mi)

Population (2006)
  - Total: 23,229
  - Density: 296.7/km^{2} (768.6/sq mi)
  - Urban: 16,579
  - Rural: 6,650
- Website: http://www.konstancinjeziorna.pl/

Gmina Konstancin-Jeziorna is an urban-rural gmina (administrative district) in Piaseczno County, Masovian Voivodeship, in east-central Poland. Its seat is the town of Konstancin-Jeziorna, which lies approximately 8 kilometres (5 mi) east of Piaseczno and 17 km (11 mi) south-east of Warsaw.

The gmina covers an area of 78.28 square kilometres (30.2 sq mi), and as of 2006 its total population is 23,229 (out of which the population of Konstancin-Jeziorna amounts to 16,579, and the population of the rural part of the gmina is 6,650).

The gmina contains part of the protected area called Chojnów Landscape Park.

== Villages ==
Apart from the town of Konstancin-Jeziorna, Gmina Konstancin-Jeziorna contains the villages and settlements of Bielawa, Borowina, Cieciszew, Ciszyca, Czarnów, Czernidła, Gassy, Habdzin, Kawęczyn, Kawęczynek, Kępa Okrzewska, Kierszek, Łęg, Obórki, Obory, Okrzeszyn, Opacz, Parcela-Obory, Piaski, Słomczyn and Turowice.

== Neighbouring gminas ==
Gmina Konstancin-Jeziorna is bordered by Warsaw, by the towns of Józefów and Otwock, and by the gminas of Góra Kalwaria, Karczew and Piaseczno.
