= Dębiny Osuchowskie =

- Village
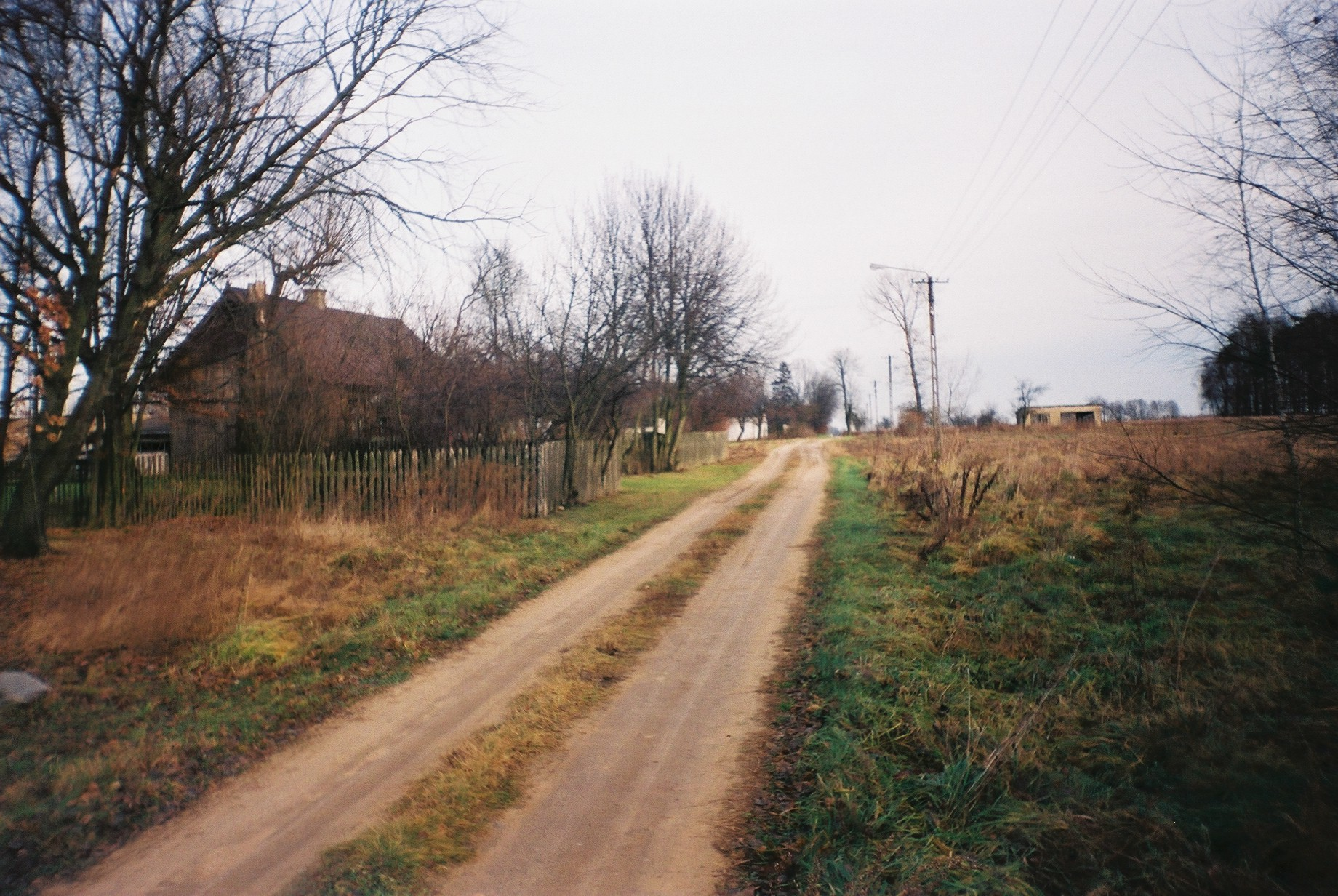

- Location within Poland
- Coordinates: 51°54′17″N 20°37′1″E
- Country: Poland
- Voivodeship: Masovian
- County: Żyrardów
- Gmina: Mszczonów
- Elevation: 181 m (594 ft)
- Population: 20

Dębiny Osuchowskie [dɛmˈbinɨ ɔsuˈxɔfskʲɛ] is a village in the administrative district of Gmina Mszczonów, within Żyrardów County, Masovian Voivodeship, in east-central Poland.

The village has a gravel pit that had been abandoned for many years before the exploitation works began again in 2008. Also the source of the Jeziorka River is located here.
