= Tadeusz Grzesik =

Polish serial killer

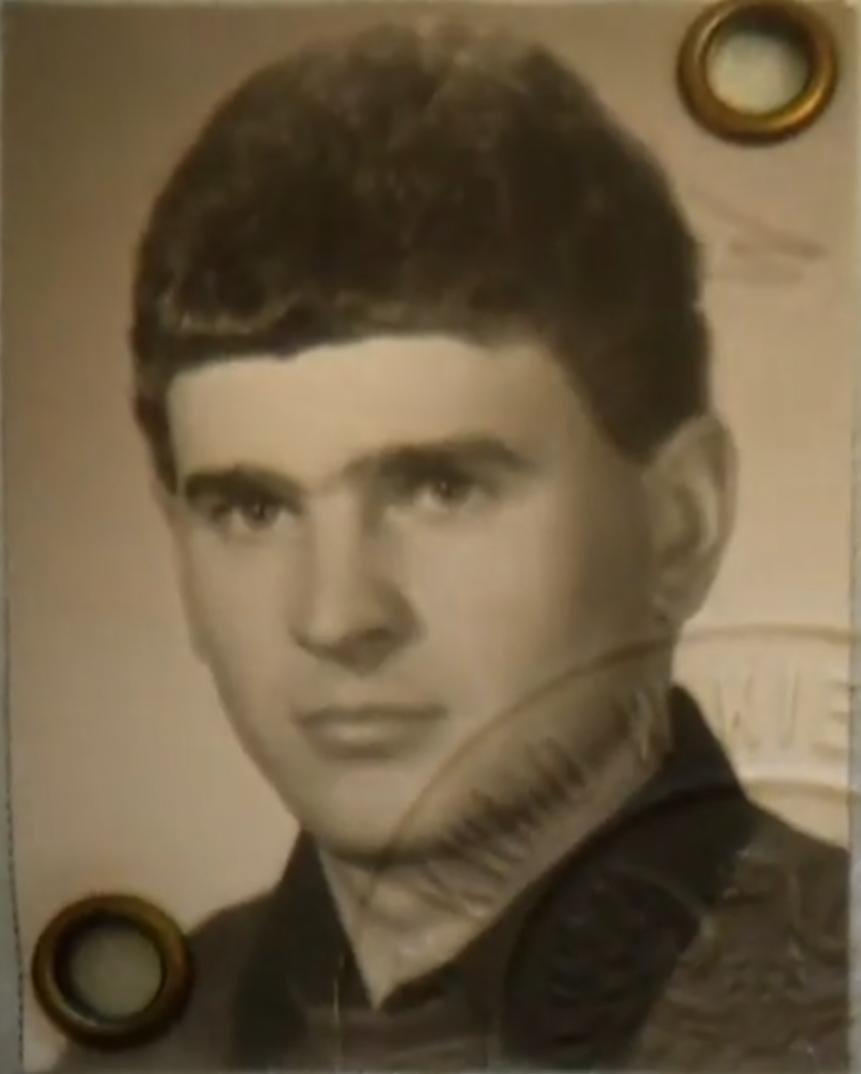
- Tadeusz Grzesik passport photo (1980s)
- Born: 24 March 1960 (age 66); Wola Jachowa, Polish People's Republic
- Other names: "Strawberry" "Killer"
- Conviction: Murder
- Penalty: Life imprisonment

Details
- Victims: 8–20+
- Span of crimes: 1991–2007
- Country: Poland
- States: Świętokrzyskie, Lublin, Silesia, Lesser Poland, Łódź, allegedly others as well
- Date apprehended: 2007

Tadeusz Grzesik (born 24 March 1960) is a Polish strawberry grower, serial killer, and sex offender, also known as "Strawberry" and "Killer". He is the leader of a gang which went on to be called the "Moneychangers Gang", or (more precisely) "Gang of Moneychangers Killers".

== Early life ==
Tadeusz Grzesik was born in Wola Jachowa, where his parents ran a farm. He had four siblings. He studied at a vocational school to become a fitter, but did not graduate. According to his own account, he then became a carpenter who worked in the Wujek and Makoszowy coal mines, before beginning work in the Construction Combination in Katowice.

Grzesik is married and has two children.

== Murders ==
=== Triple murder in Cedzyna ===
The most likely first murders Grzesik took part in were on 19 September 1991, in Cedzyna, when he participated in the shooting of three Ukrainian citizens in a parking lot - two men and a woman. He raped the woman before killing her. Biological traces belonging to two men were secured from her body, but the case was discontinued in 1993. In 2001, the investigation was resumed and suspicions fell on Janusz Trela's gang, but the trail proved false, and the case remained unsolved for 18 years. The breakthrough came when Grzesik was arrested in 2007 and he took a DNA test, making it possible to connect him to the murders in Cedzyna. The second secured DNA was traced to Stanisław T. However, he did not outlive the trial, as he had committed suicide during his imprisonment in the main prison of Piotrków Trybunalski. In addition to the trace evidence in the case was also the testimony of gunsmith Jacek P., who admitted that in 1991 he had crafted a Beretta for Grzesik, the same weapon with which the murders were carried out. Grzesik was legally sentenced to 25 years imprisonment in 2013 in connection with the three murders and rape.

=== Suspected murder in Machowa ===
The prosecutor's office is investigating Grzesik's possible involvement in the murder of a currency dealer in 1992.

=== Wola Jachowa disappearance ===
Grzesik is also suspected of murdering a resident of his hometown in August 1997, who was possibly killed because of debt-related issues. The victim's body was never found.

=== Double murder in Cedzyna ===
Another case in which Grzesik is suspected is the murder of two men from Radlin, Łukasz S. and Mariusz J., both of whom were shot in front of a bar on 3 July 1998.

=== Skorzeszyce murder ===
Grzesik is also suspected of another crime - the murder of 17-year-old Roman K. on the night between 18 and 19 July 1998. The teen was returning from a discotheque when he was brutally murdered, with two of his friends being brutally beaten up and left requiring hospitalization. His body was found in the morning of 19 July.

=== Niestachów murder ===
Grzesik is also suspected of murdering Res-Bud driver Andrzej K., who was shot on 30 April 1999.

=== Krajno-Parcelach murder ===
On 20 June 1999, Krystyna M. was murdered. She, just like Andrzej K., was a worker at Res-Bud who was shot. Grzesik is suspected of being involved in her murder.

=== 'Bureaucrats Gang' murders ===
Grzesik, together with Wojciech W. and Jacek P., created a gang that between 2005 and 2007 attacked owners of currency exchange offices. They were convicted in 2015. The offences for which they were convicted are the following:

- murder in Kraśnik (December 2005)
- attempted murder in Sosnowiec (January 2006)
- murder in Tarnów (January 2007)
- murder and attempted murder in Piotrków Trybunalski (January 2007)
- double murder in Myślenice (February 2007)

However, according to the prosecutor's office, these killings do not constitute all the crimes committed by the gang. In 2016, Grzesik and Wojciech W. were accused of a double murder in Ostrów. On 16 November 2006, they allegedly attacked Antoni B., the owner of a currency exchange office who was killed with a sub-machine gun. They also had shot at two employees of the exchange office, one of them dying as a result of his wounds, while the other suffered long-term damage to his health. Further allegations made by the prosecutor's office concern murders in Przeworsk. The perpetrators were said to have killed the owner of an exchange office, Zygmunt G. and his partner, Maria P. On 12 January 2007, Grzesik, along with accomplice Adam M., according to the prosecutor's office, attacked an exchange office in Dębica and attempted to kill the owner, but failed to do so as a result of their weapons jamming.

According to Gazeta Wyborcza, the group had also committed various crimes in Daleszyce, Kolbuszowa, Domaszowice, Cedzyna, Sanok, Makoszyn, Miąsowa and other towns.

== In the media ==
Grzesik and his accomplices were killed in the 13th episode in the third season of the hit Polish TV series Pitbull; some details of the crimes committed were changed for the scenario.

== See also ==
- List of serial killers by country
- List of serial killers by number of victims

== Bibliography ==
- Grzegorz Walczak: Is he the greatest killer in the post-war history of Poland? Why Tadeusz from Górna, a strawberry planter, had been unpunished for so many years [accessed 2018-01-10]
- Elżbieta Zemsta: The triple murder in Cedzyna was one of the darkest crimes. We reveal her story. [accessed 2018-01-10]
