= Krajno Pierwsze =

- Village
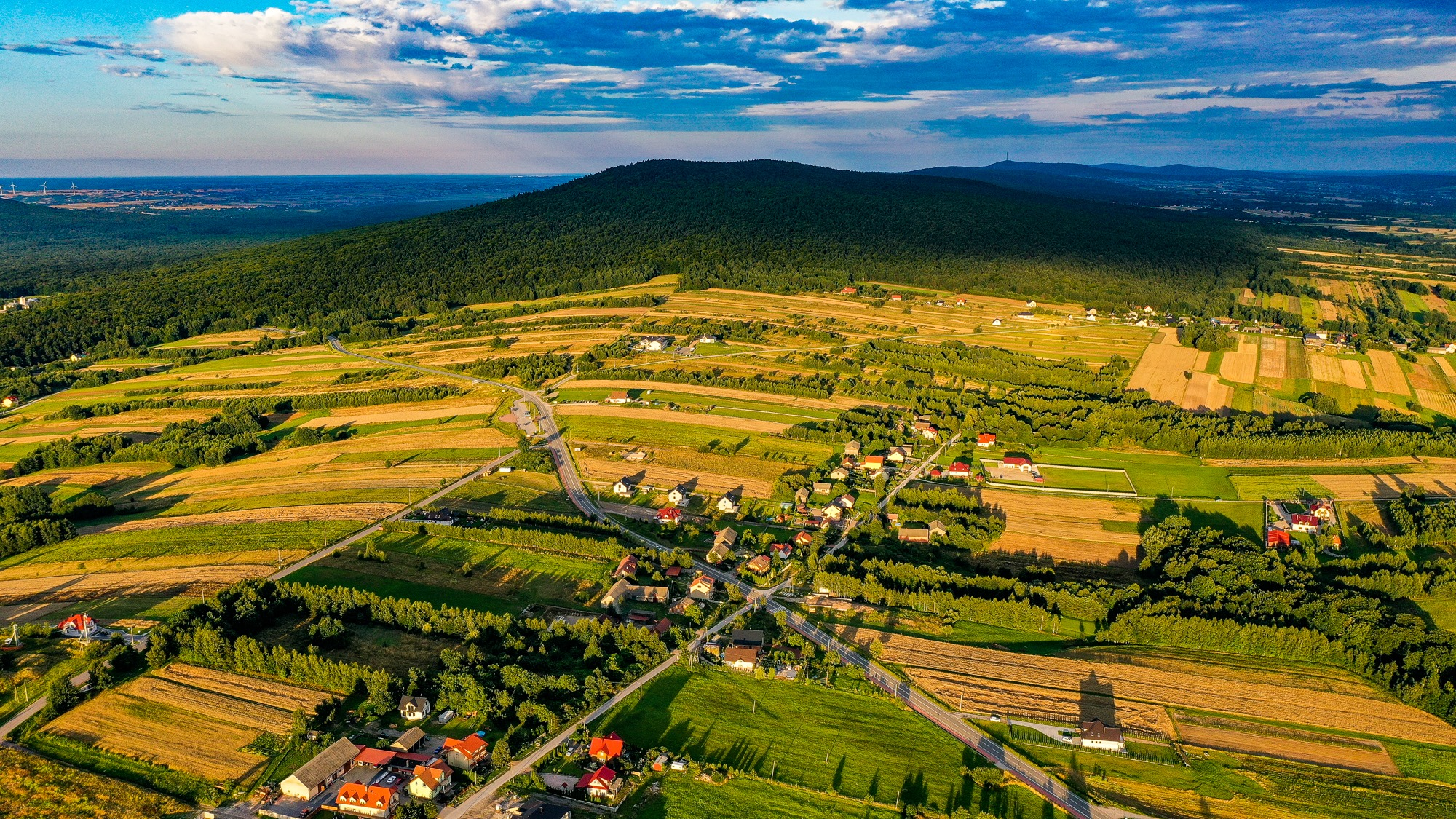

- Location within Poland
- Coordinates: 50°53′34″N 20°51′2″E
- Country: Poland
- Voivodeship: Świętokrzyskie
- County: Kielce
- Gmina: Górno
- Population: 631

Krajno Pierwsze [ˈkrai̯nɔ ˈpjɛrfʂɛ] is a village in the administrative district of Gmina Górno, within Kielce County, Świętokrzyskie Voivodeship, in south-central Poland. It lies approximately 6 km (4 mi) north of Górno and 17 km (11 mi) east of the regional capital Kielce.
