= Barcza =

Barcza may refer to:

- Barcza Opening, chess opening system
- Barcza (surname), found in Hungary
- Barcza, Poland, a village

== See also ==
- Barcsa
