= Radlin, Świętokrzyskie Voivodeship =

Radlin
- Village
- Location within Poland
- Coordinates: 50°51′41″N 20°45′7″E
- Country: Poland
- Voivodeship: Świętokrzyskie
- County: Kielce
- Gmina: Górno

Population (approx.)
  - Total: 1,400
- Postal code: 26-008

Radlin [ˈradlʲin] is a village in the administrative district of Gmina Górno, within Kielce County, Świętokrzyskie Voivodeship, in south-central Poland. It is located approximately 6 km (4 mi) west of Górno and 10 km (6 mi) east of the regional capital Kielce.
