= Krajno-Parcele =

- Village
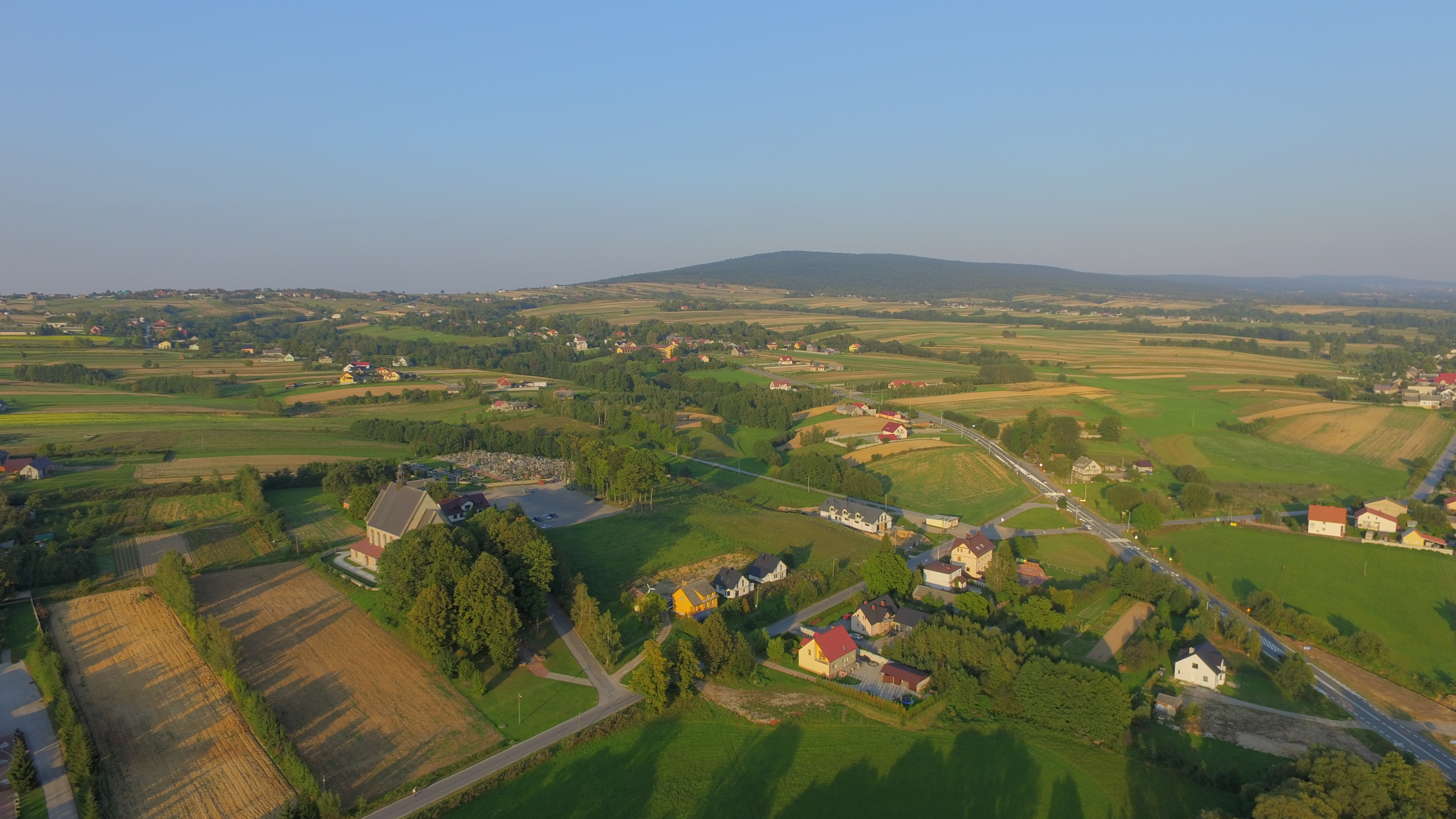

- Location within Poland
- Coordinates: 50°52′22″N 20°50′10″E
- Country: Poland
- Voivodeship: Świętokrzyskie
- County: Kielce
- Gmina: Górno
- Population: 430

Krajno-Parcele [ˈkrai̯nɔ parˈt͡sɛlɛ] is a village in the administrative district of Gmina Górno, within Kielce County, Świętokrzyskie Voivodeship, in south-central Poland. It lies approximately 3 km (2 mi) north of Górno and 16 km (10 mi) east of the regional capital Kielce.
