= Bęczków =

- Village
- Location within Poland
- Coordinates: 50°52′33″N 20°48′10″E
- Country: Poland
- Voivodeship: Świętokrzyskie
- County: Kielce
- Gmina: Górno

Bęczków [ˈbɛnt͡ʂkuf] is a village in the administrative district of Gmina Górno, within Kielce County, Świętokrzyskie Voivodeship, in south-central Poland. It lies approximately 4 km (2 mi) north-west of Górno and 14 km (9 mi) east of the regional capital Kielce.
