= Brzezinki, Kielce County =

Brzezinki
- Village
- Location within Poland
- Coordinates: 50°55′26″N 20°46′7″E
- Country: Poland
- Voivodeship: Świętokrzyskie
- County: Kielce
- Gmina: Masłów
- Population: 526

Brzezinki [bʐɛˈʑinki] is a village in the administrative district of Gmina Masłów, within Kielce County, Świętokrzyskie Voivodeship, in south-central Poland. It lies approximately 4 km (2 mi) north-east of Masłów and 12 km (7 mi) north-east of the regional capital Kielce.
