= Mąchocice Kapitulne =

- Village
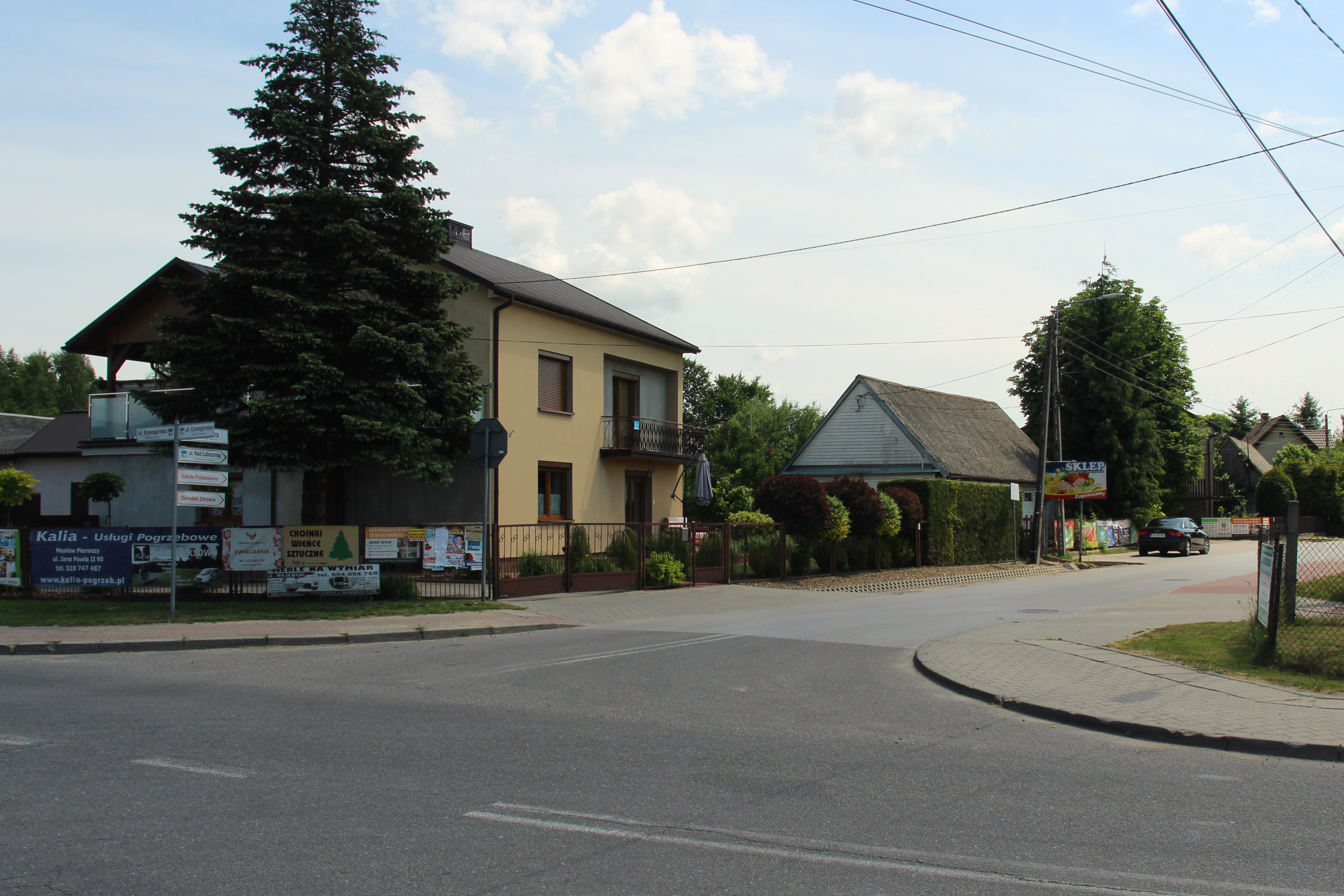

- Location within Poland
- Coordinates: 50°54′0″N 20°45′22″E
- Country: Poland
- Voivodeship: Świętokrzyskie
- County: Kielce
- Gmina: Masłów
- Population: 1,366

Mąchocice Kapitulne [mɔ̃xɔˈt͡ɕit͡sɛ kapiˈtulnɛ] is a village in the administrative district of Gmina Masłów, within Kielce County, Świętokrzyskie Voivodeship, in south-central Poland. It lies approximately 3 km (2 mi) east of Masłów and 10 km (6 mi) east of the regional capital Kielce.
