= Tumlin-Podgród =

- Village
- Location within Poland
- Coordinates: 50°57′44″N 20°34′2″E
- Country: Poland
- Voivodeship: Świętokrzyskie
- County: Kielce
- Gmina: Miedziana Góra
- Population: 492

Tumlin-Podgród [ˈtumlin ˈpɔdɡrut] is a village in the administrative district of Gmina Miedziana Góra, within Kielce County, Świętokrzyskie Voivodeship, in south-central Poland. It lies approximately 4 km (2 mi) north of Miedziana Góra and 10 km (6 mi) north of the regional capital Kielce.
