= Kostomłoty =

Kostomłoty may refer to the following places in Poland:

- Kostomłoty, Lower Silesian Voivodeship (south-west Poland)
- Gmina Kostomłoty, a gmina in Lower Silesian Voivodeship, (south-west Poland)
- Kostomłoty, Lublin Voivodeship (east Poland)
- Kostomłoty Pierwsze, administrative in Kielce County, Świętokrzyskie Voivodeship
- Kostomłoty Drugie, a village in Kielce County, Świętokrzyskie Voivodeship
