= Górno-Parcele =

- Village
- Location within Poland
- Coordinates: 50°51′35″N 20°49′37″E
- Country: Poland
- Voivodeship: Świętokrzyskie
- County: Kielce
- Gmina: Górno
- Population: 420

Górno-Parcele [ˈɡurnɔ parˈt͡sɛlɛ] is a village in the administrative district of Gmina Górno, within Kielce County, Świętokrzyskie Voivodeship, in south-central Poland. It lies approximately 2 km (1 mi) north of Górno and 16 km (10 mi) east of the regional capital Kielce.
