= Ciosowa =

- Village
- Location within Poland
- Coordinates: 50°56′55″N 20°31′52″E
- Country: Poland
- Voivodeship: Świętokrzyskie
- County: Kielce
- Gmina: Miedziana Góra
- Population: 483

Ciosowa [t͡ɕɔˈsɔva] is a village in the administrative district of Gmina Miedziana Góra, within Kielce County, Świętokrzyskie Voivodeship, in south-central Poland. It lies approximately 4 km (2 mi) north-west of Miedziana Góra and 10 km (6 mi) north-west of the regional capital Kielce.
