= Przyjmo =

- Village
- Location within Poland
- Coordinates: 50°58′55″N 20°31′5″E
- Country: Poland
- Voivodeship: Świętokrzyskie
- County: Kielce
- Gmina: Miedziana Góra
- Population: 527

Przyjmo [ˈpʂɨi̯mɔ] is a village in the administrative district of Gmina Miedziana Góra, within Kielce County, Świętokrzyskie Voivodeship, in south-central Poland. It lies approximately 7 km (4 mi) north-west of Miedziana Góra and 13 km (8 mi) north-west of the regional capital Kielce.
