= Wiśniówka, Świętokrzyskie Voivodeship =

Wiśniówka
- Village
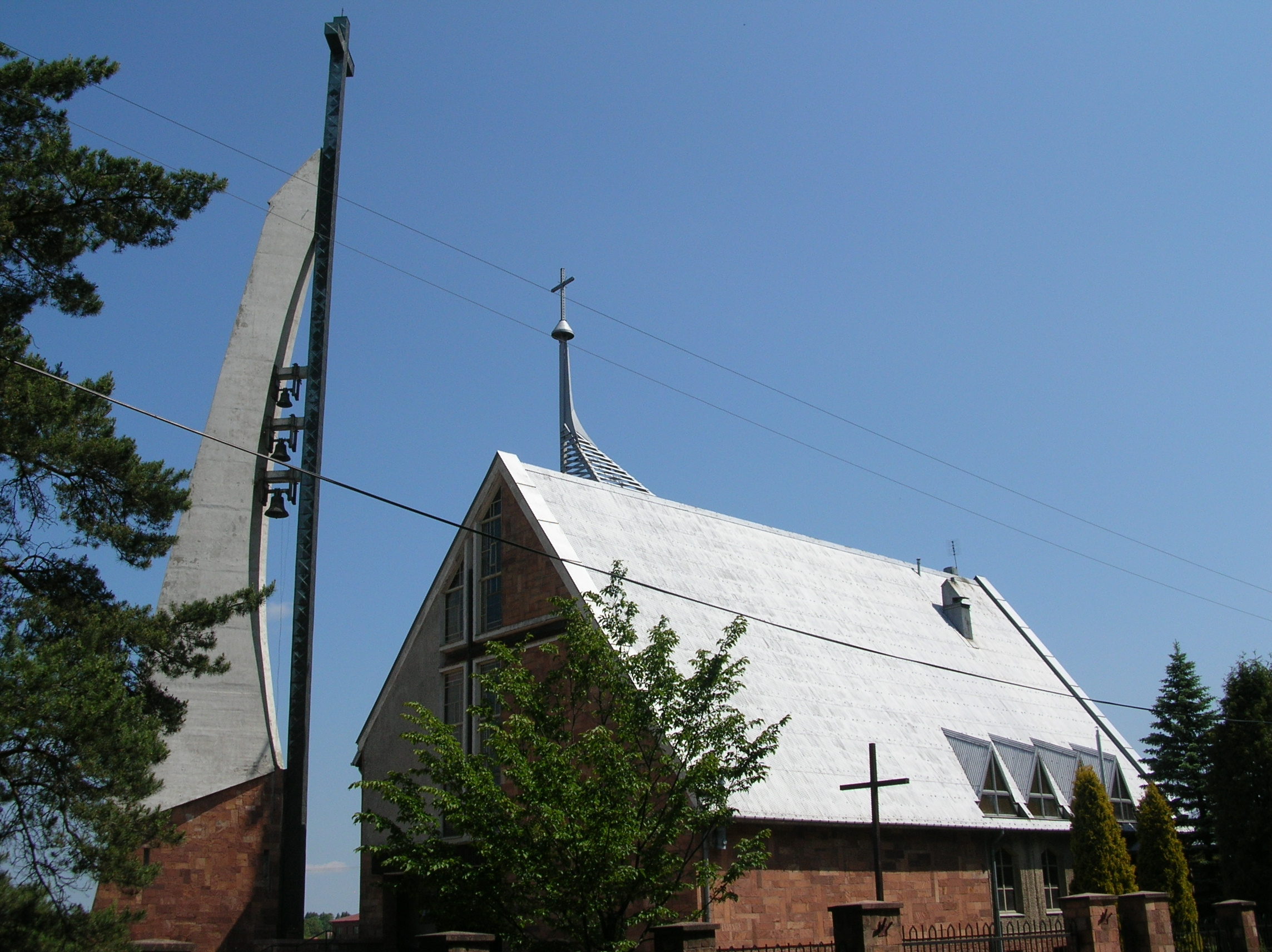
- Church

- Location within Poland
- Coordinates: 50°55′54″N 20°40′41″E
- Country: Poland
- Voivodeship: Świętokrzyskie
- County: Kielce
- Gmina: Masłów
- Population: 594

Wiśniówka [viɕˈɲufka] is a village in the administrative district of Gmina Masłów, within Kielce County, Świętokrzyskie Voivodeship, in south-central Poland. It lies approximately 5 km (3 mi) north-west of Masłów and 7 km (4 mi) north-east of the regional capital Kielce.
