= Leszczyny, Kielce County =

Leszczyny
- Village
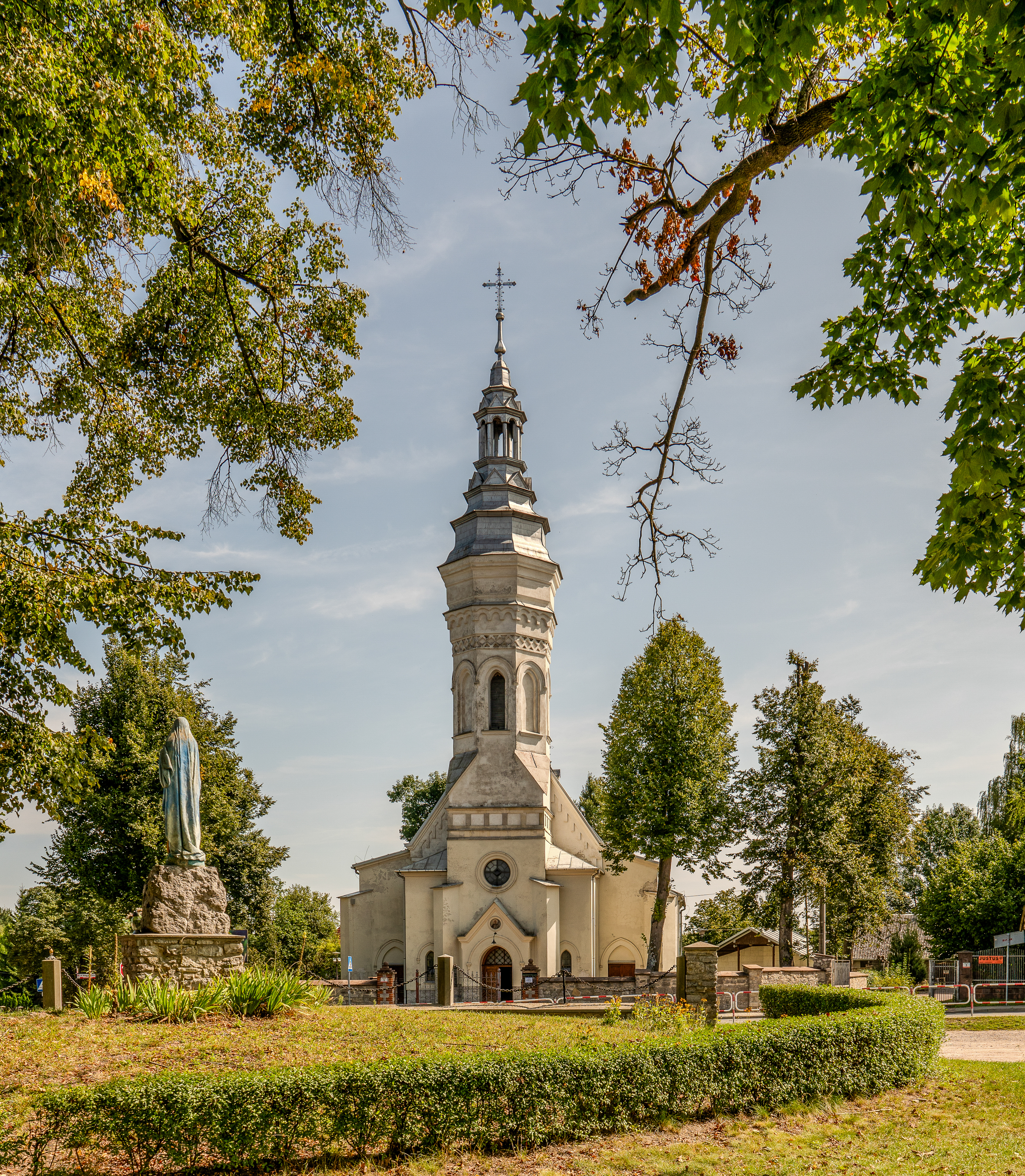
- Catholic church

- Location within Poland
- Coordinates: 50°52′N 20°47′E
- Country: Poland
- Voivodeship: Świętokrzyskie
- County: Kielce
- Gmina: Górno
- Population: 960

Leszczyny [lɛʂˈt͡ʂɨnɨ] is a village in the administrative district of Gmina Górno, within Kielce County, Świętokrzyskie Voivodeship, in south-central Poland. It lies approximately 4 km (2 mi) north-west of Górno and 12 km (7 mi) east of the regional capital Kielce.
