= Ciekoty =

- Village
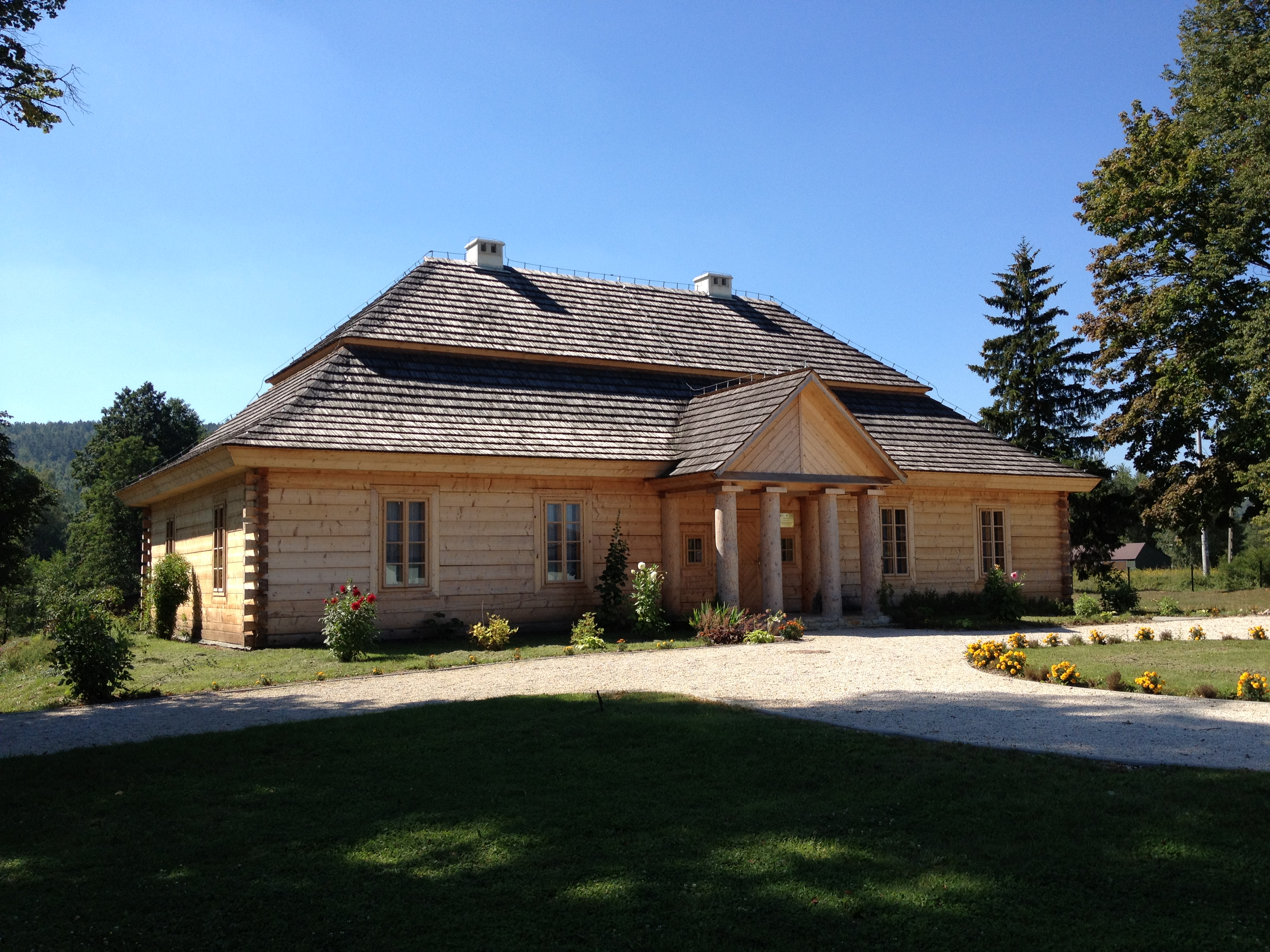

- Location within Poland
- Coordinates: 50°54′44″N 20°48′32″E
- Country: Poland
- Voivodeship: Świętokrzyskie
- County: Kielce
- Gmina: Masłów
- Population: 361

Ciekoty [t͡ɕɛˈkɔtɨ] is a village in the administrative district of Gmina Masłów, within Kielce County, Świętokrzyskie Voivodeship, in south-central Poland. It lies approximately 6 km (4 mi) east of Masłów and 14 km (9 mi) east of the regional capital Kielce. Geographically, it lies near the base of Mount Radostowa in the Łysogóry range of the Świętokrzyskie Mountains.
