= Krajno Drugie =

- Village
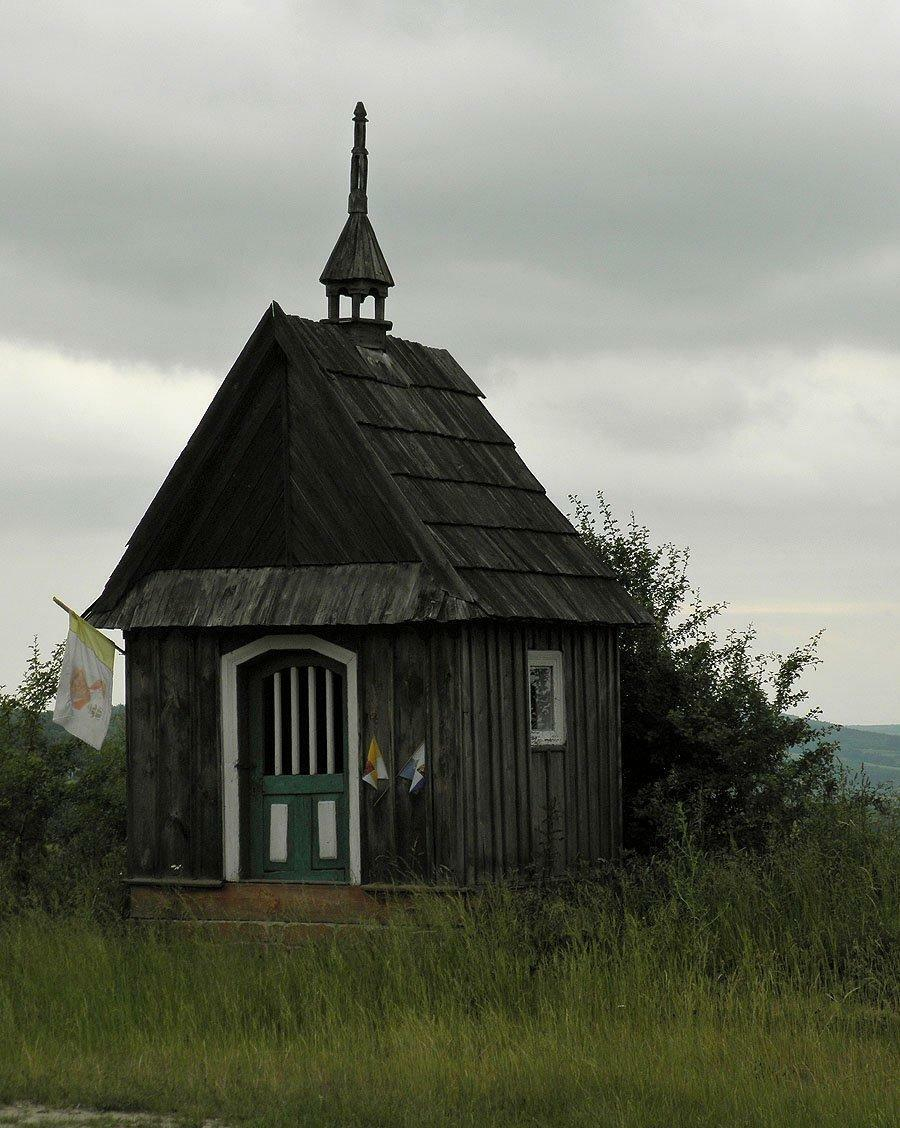
- Chapel

- Location within Poland
- Coordinates: 50°52′21″N 20°51′24″E
- Country: Poland
- Voivodeship: Świętokrzyskie
- County: Kielce
- Gmina: Górno

Krajno Drugie [ˈkrai̯nɔ ˈdruɡʲɛ] is a village in the administrative district of Gmina Górno, within Kielce County, Świętokrzyskie Voivodeship, in south-central Poland. It lies approximately 4 km (2 mi) north-east of Górno and 17 km (11 mi) east of the regional capital Kielce.
