= Podmąchocice =

- Village
- Location within Poland
- Coordinates: 50°53′25″N 20°47′16″E
- Country: Poland
- Voivodeship: Świętokrzyskie
- County: Kielce
- Gmina: Górno
- Population: 170

Podmąchocice [pɔdmɔ̃xɔˈt͡ɕit͡sɛ] is a village in the administrative district of Gmina Górno, within Kielce County, Świętokrzyskie Voivodeship, in south-central Poland. It lies approximately 6 km (4 mi) north-west of Górno and 13 km (8 mi) east of the regional capital Kielce.
