= Dąbrowa, Kielce County =

Dąbrowa
- Village
- Location within Poland
- Coordinates: 50°54′30″N 20°41′15″E
- Country: Poland
- Voivodeship: Świętokrzyskie
- County: Kielce
- Gmina: Masłów
- Population: 1,059

Dąbrowa [dɔmˈbrɔva] is a village in the administrative district of Gmina Masłów, within Kielce County, Świętokrzyskie Voivodeship, in south-central Poland. It lies approximately 3 km (2 mi) west of Masłów and 6 km (4 mi) north-east of the regional capital Kielce.
