= Krajno-Zagórze =

- Village
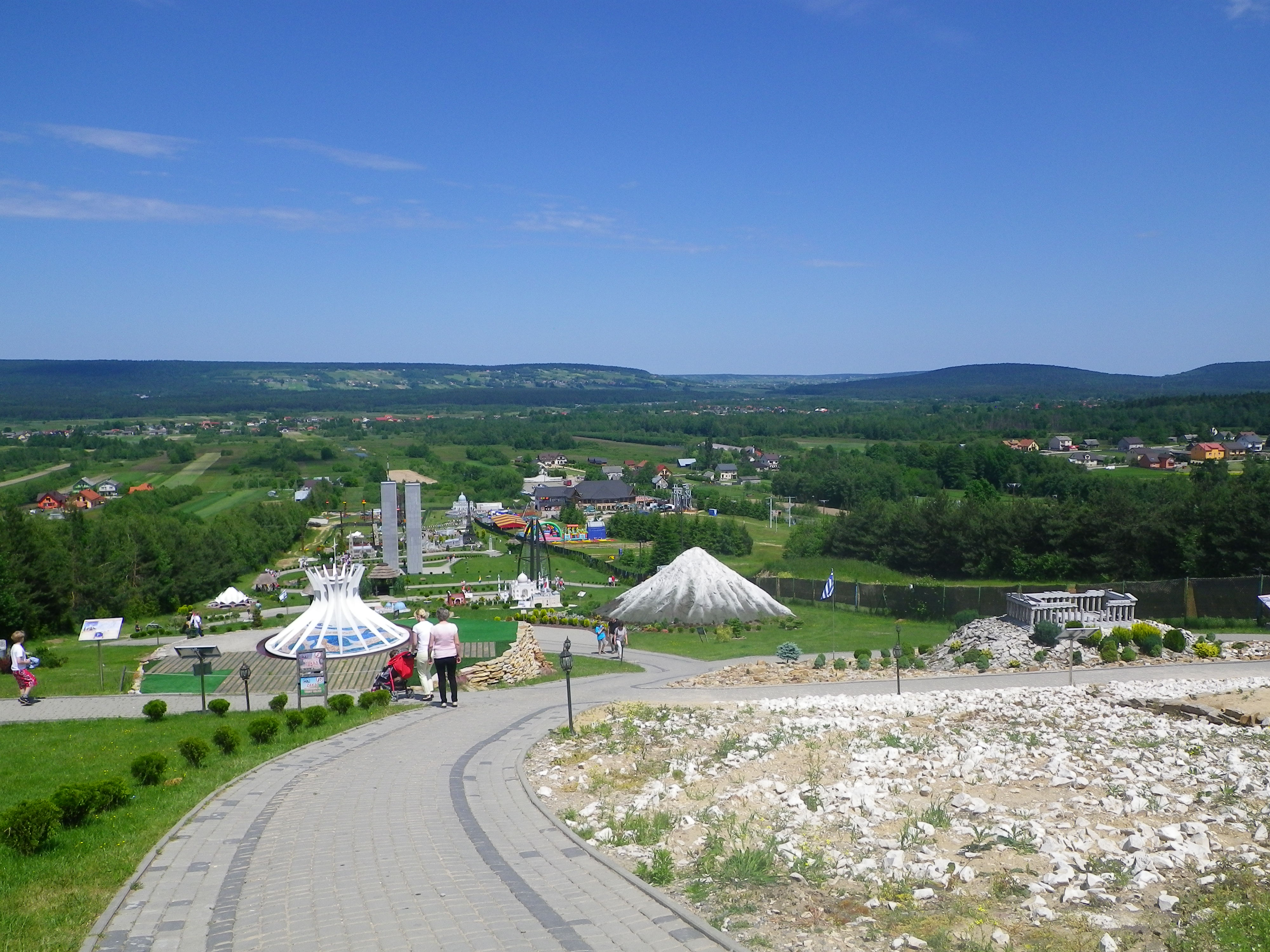
- Miniature park

- Location within Poland
- Coordinates: 50°54′3″N 20°50′0″E
- Country: Poland
- Voivodeship: Świętokrzyskie
- County: Kielce
- Gmina: Górno
- Population: 430

Krajno-Zagórze [ˈkrai̯nɔ zaˈɡuʐɛ] is a village in the administrative district of Gmina Górno, within Kielce County, Świętokrzyskie Voivodeship, in south-central Poland. It lies approximately 6 km (4 mi) north of Górno and 16 km (10 mi) east of the regional capital Kielce.
