= Skorzeszyce =

- Village
- Location within Poland
- Coordinates: 50°49′50″N 20°52′48″E
- Country: Poland
- Voivodeship: Świętokrzyskie
- County: Kielce
- Gmina: Górno
- Population: 1,300

Skorzeszyce [skɔʐɛˈʂɨt͡sɛ] is a village in the administrative district of Gmina Górno, within Kielce County, Świętokrzyskie Voivodeship, in south-central Poland. It lies approximately 5 km (3 mi) south-east of Górno and 20 km (12 mi) east of the regional capital Kielce.
