= Ćmińsk =

- Village
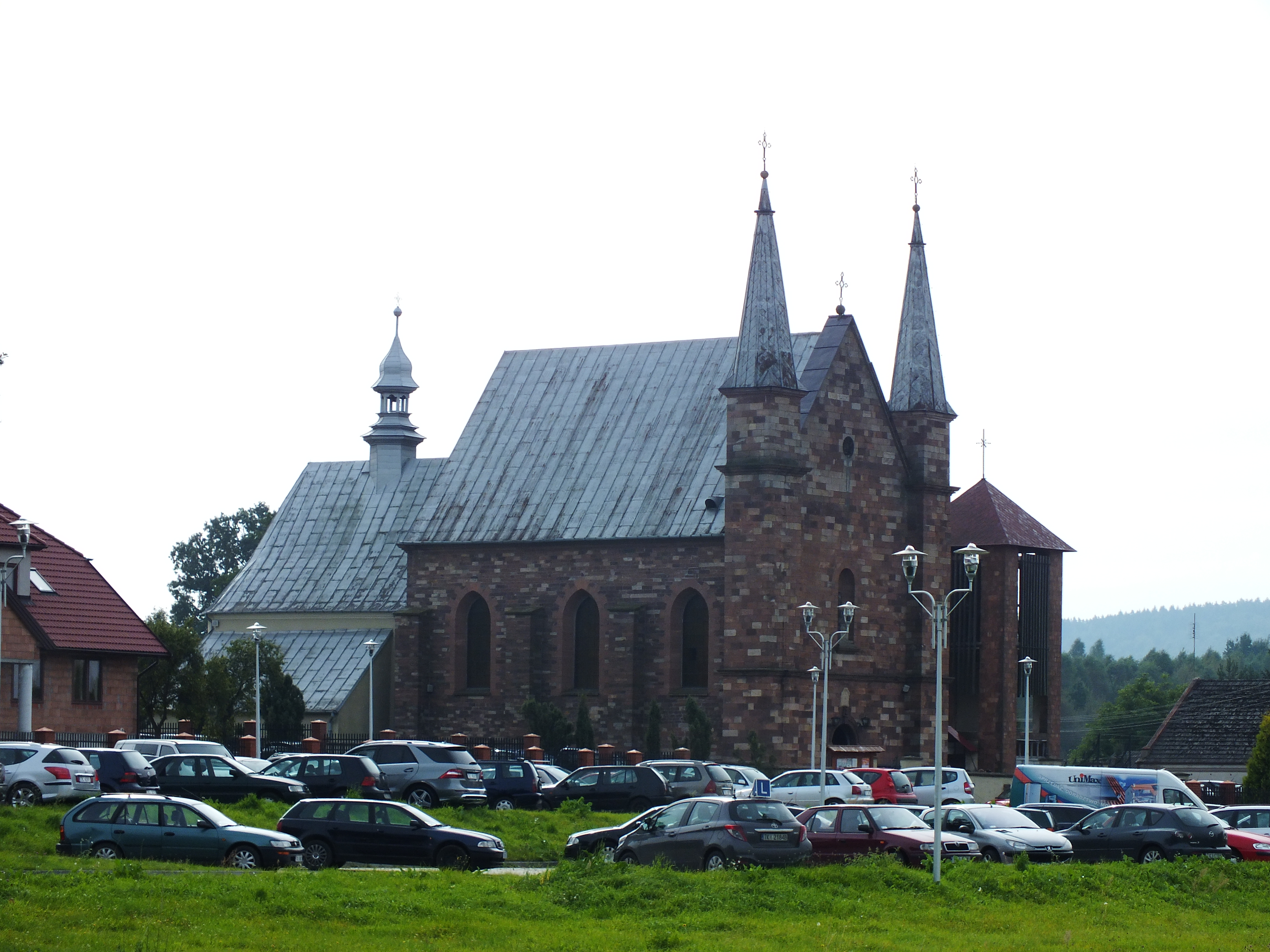
- Catholic church

- Location within Poland
- Coordinates: 50°59′9″N 20°32′58″E
- Country: Poland
- Voivodeship: Świętokrzyskie
- County: Kielce
- Gmina: Miedziana Góra

Population
  - Total: 2,381

Ćmińsk [t͡ɕmiɲsk] is a village in the administrative district of Gmina Miedziana Góra, within Kielce County, Świętokrzyskie Voivodeship, in south-central Poland. It lies approximately 7 km (4 mi) north of Miedziana Góra and 13 km (8 mi) north-west of the regional capital Kielce.

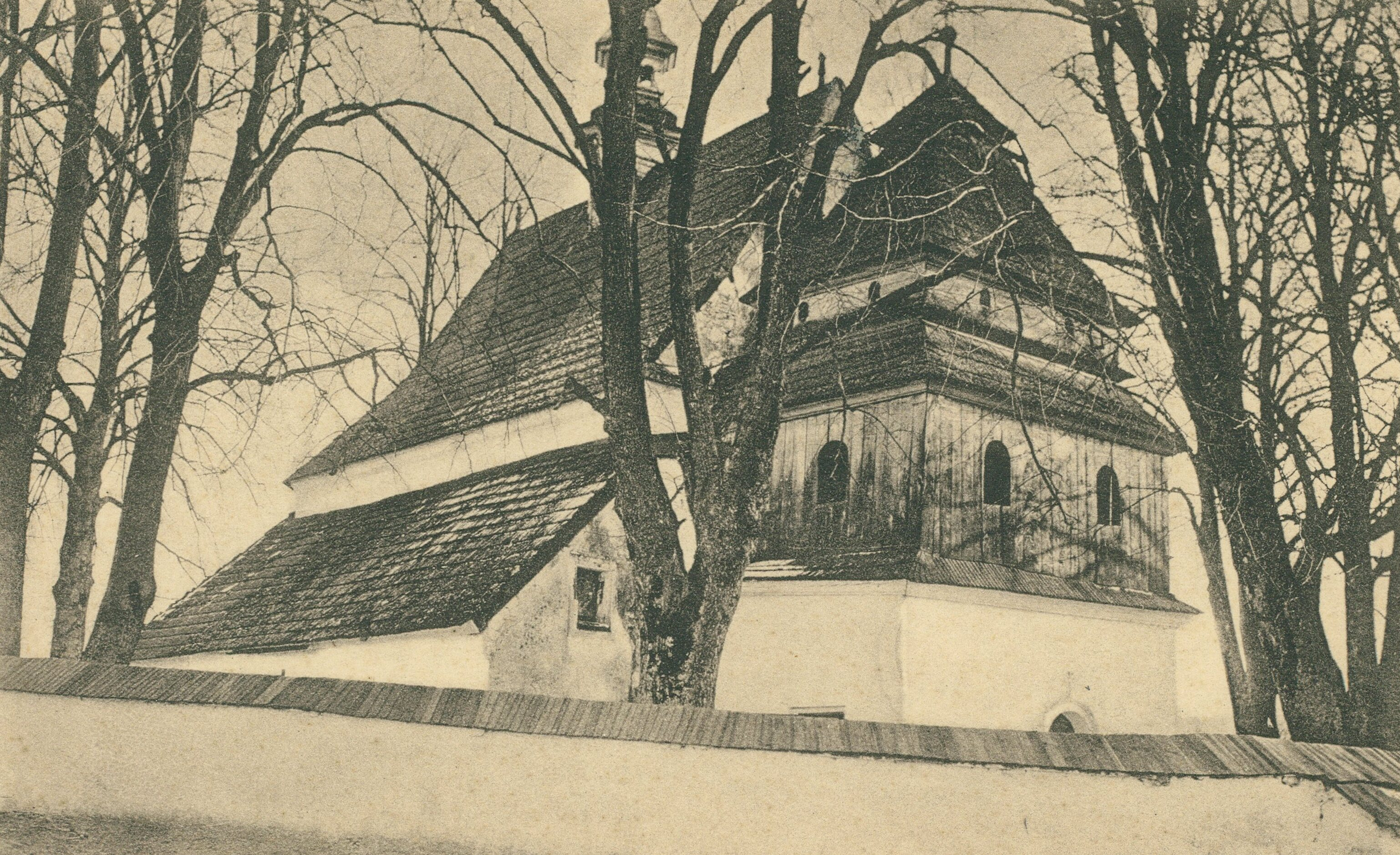
Church before 1915
