= Wola Kopcowa =

- Village
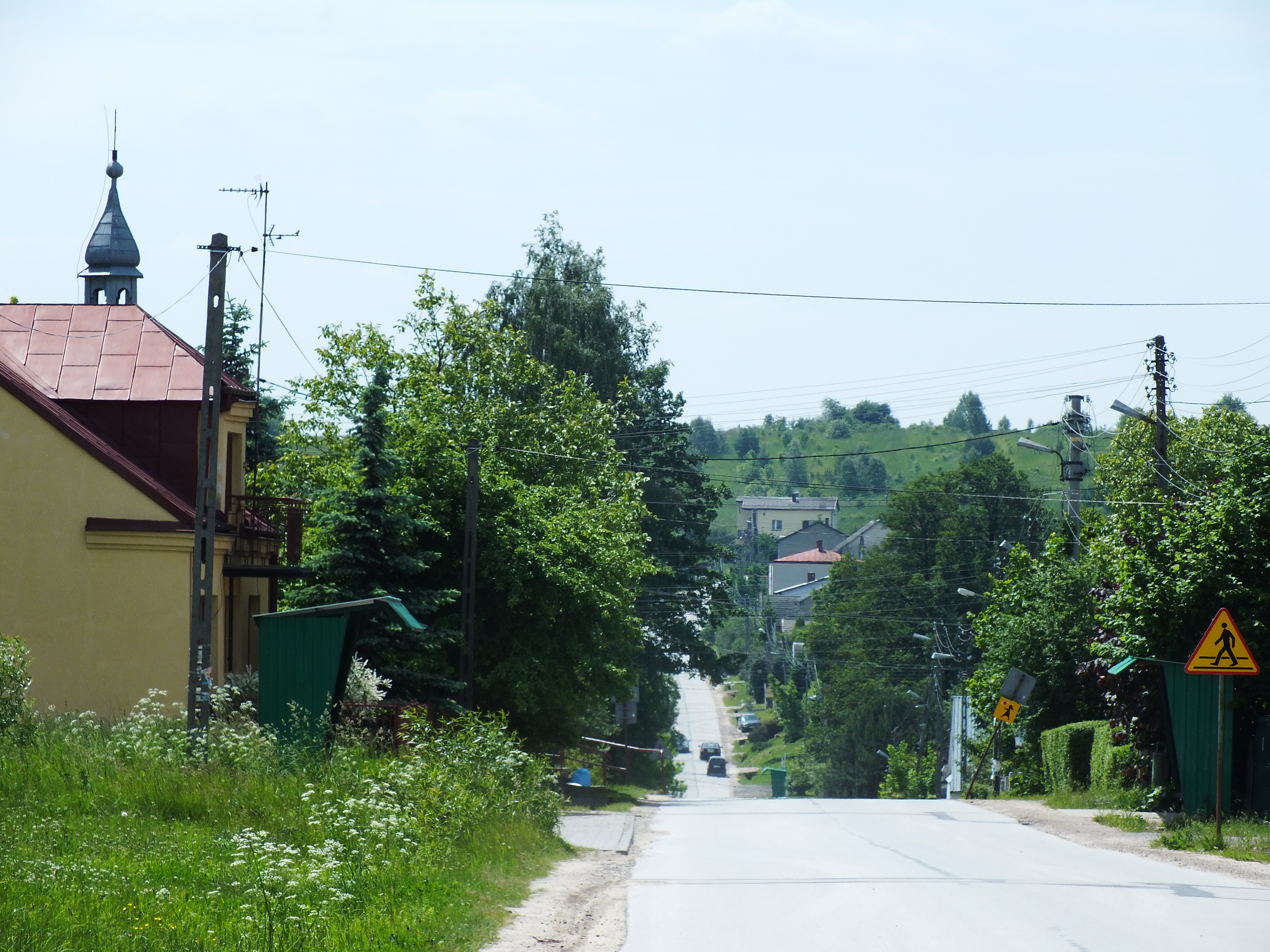

- Location within Poland
- Coordinates: 50°52′50″N 20°42′45″E
- Country: Poland
- Voivodeship: Świętokrzyskie
- County: Kielce
- Gmina: Masłów
- Population: 1,010

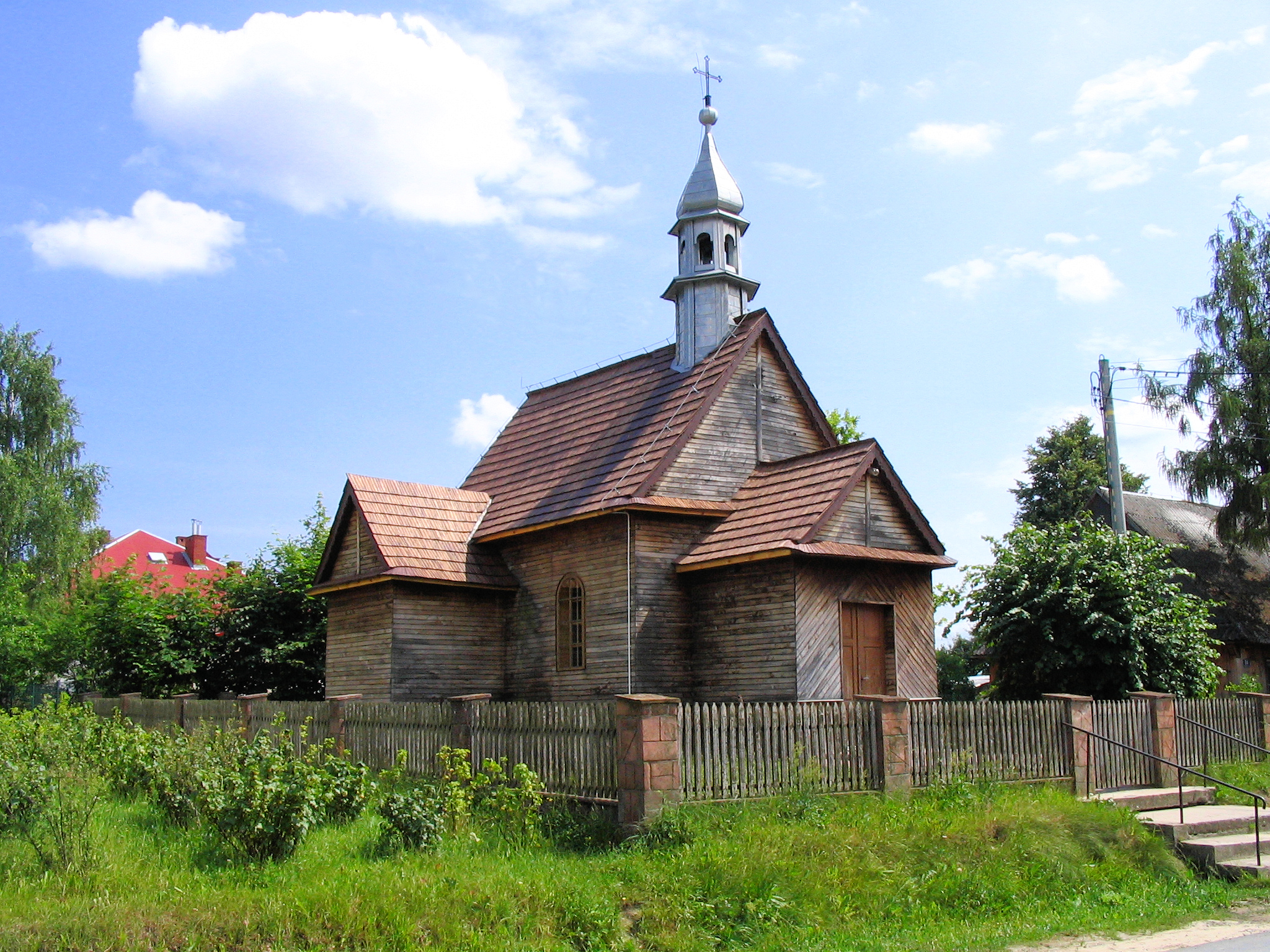
Chapel

Wola Kopcowa [ˈvɔla kɔpˈt͡sɔva] is a village in the administrative district of Gmina Masłów, within Kielce County, Świętokrzyskie Voivodeship, in south-central Poland. It lies approximately 4 km (2 mi) south of Masłów and 7 km (4 mi) east of the regional capital Kielce.
