= Dolina Marczakowa =

- Village
- Location within Poland
- Coordinates: 50°55′33″N 20°44′4″E
- Country: Poland
- Voivodeship: Świętokrzyskie
- County: Kielce
- Gmina: Masłów

Dolina Marczakowa [dɔˈlina mart͡ʂaˈkɔva] is a village in the administrative district of Gmina Masłów, within Kielce County, Świętokrzyskie Voivodeship, in south-central Poland. It lies approximately 3 km (2 mi) north of Masłów and 10 km (6 mi) north-east of the regional capital Kielce.
