= Mąchocice-Scholasteria =

- Village
- Location within Poland
- Coordinates: 50°54′49″N 20°46′53″E
- Country: Poland
- Voivodeship: Świętokrzyskie
- County: Kielce
- Gmina: Masłów
- Population: 469

Mąchocice-Scholasteria [mɔ̃xɔˈt͡ɕit͡sɛ sxɔlasˈtɛrja] is a village in the administrative district of Gmina Masłów, within Kielce County, Świętokrzyskie Voivodeship, in south-central Poland. It lies approximately 4 km (2 mi) east of Masłów and 13 km (8 mi) east of the regional capital Kielce.
