= Bobrza, Świętokrzyskie Voivodeship =

Bobrza
- Village
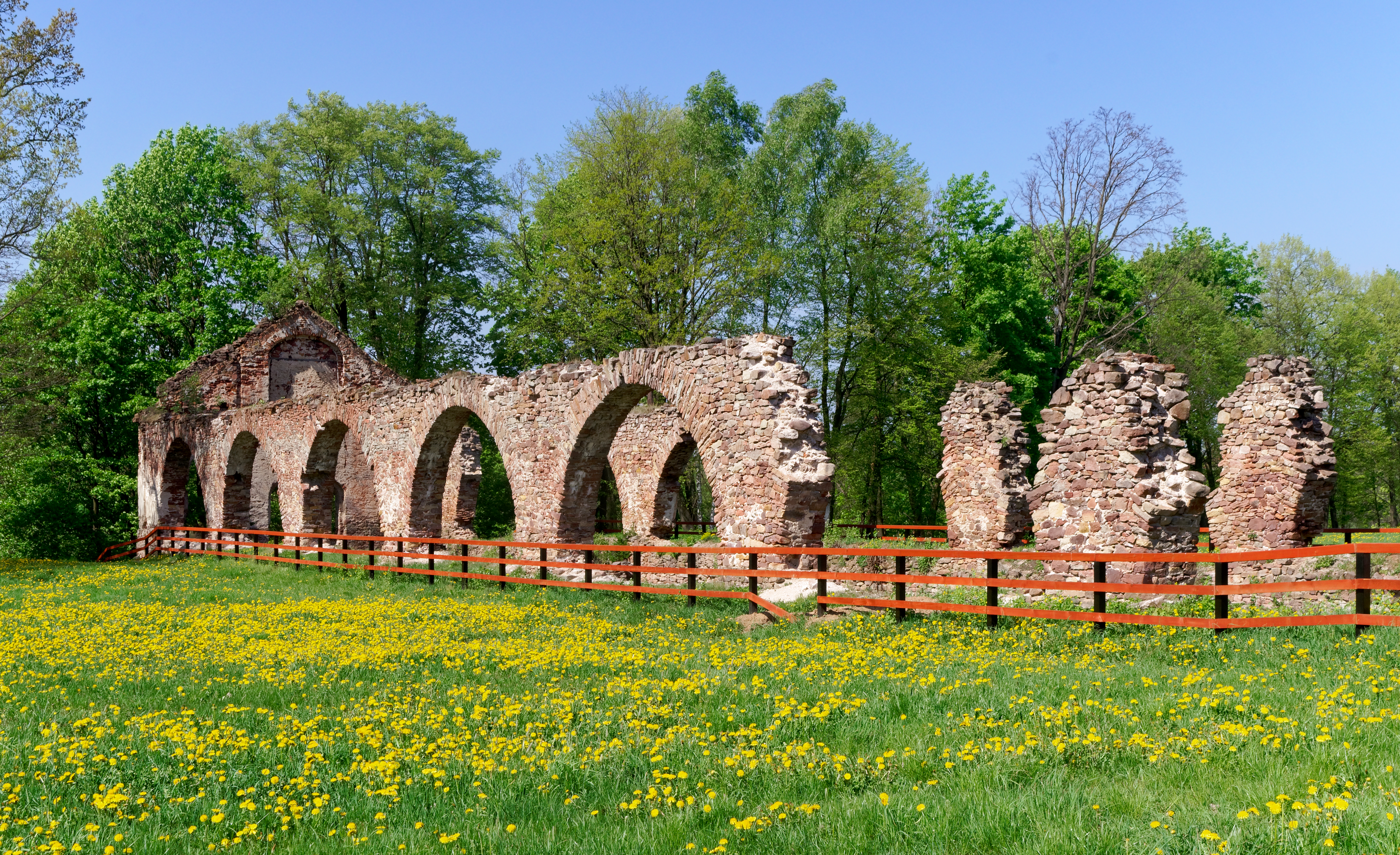

- Location within Poland
- Coordinates: 50°58′9″N 20°31′15″E
- Country: Poland
- Voivodeship: Świętokrzyskie
- County: Kielce
- Gmina: Miedziana Góra
- Population: 444

Bobrza [ˈbɔbʐa] is a village in the administrative district of Gmina Miedziana Góra, within Kielce County, Świętokrzyskie Voivodeship, in south-central Poland. It lies approximately 6 km (4 mi) north-west of Miedziana Góra and 12 km (7 mi) north-west of the regional capital Kielce.
