= Wola Jachowa =

- Village
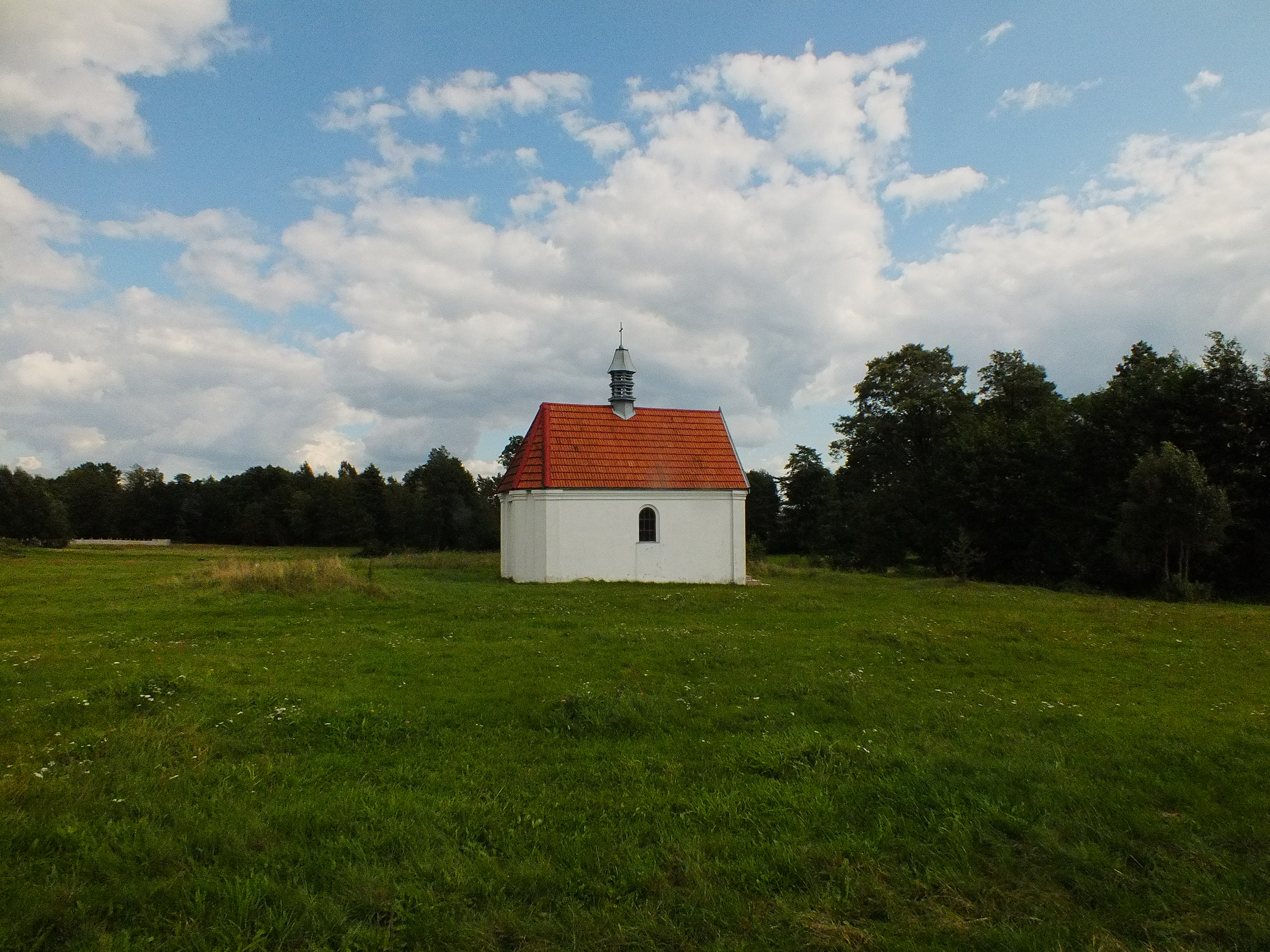
- Chapel of Saint Joachim

- Location within Poland
- Coordinates: 50°50′52″N 20°52′3″E
- Country: Poland
- Voivodeship: Świętokrzyskie
- County: Kielce
- Gmina: Górno
- Population: 1,300

Wola Jachowa [ˈvɔla jaˈxɔva] is a village in the administrative district of Gmina Górno, within Kielce County, Świętokrzyskie Voivodeship, in south-central Poland. It lies approximately 3 km (2 mi) east of Górno and 19 km (12 mi) east of the regional capital Kielce.
