= Porzecze, Świętokrzyskie Voivodeship =

Porzecze
- Village
- Location within Poland
- Coordinates: 50°57′27″N 20°30′59″E
- Country: Poland
- Voivodeship: Świętokrzyskie
- County: Kielce
- Gmina: Miedziana Góra
- Population: 446

Porzecze [pɔˈʐɛt͡ʂɛ] is a village in the administrative district of Gmina Miedziana Góra, within Kielce County, Świętokrzyskie Voivodeship, in south-central Poland. It lies approximately 5 km (3 mi) north-west of Miedziana Góra and 11 km (7 mi) north-west of the regional capital Kielce.
