= Porzecze =

Porzecze may refer to the following places:

- Porzecze, Pomeranian Voivodeship (north Poland)
- Porzecze, Świętokrzyskie Voivodeship (south-central Poland)
- Porzecze, Myślibórz County in West Pomeranian Voivodeship (north-west Poland)
- Porzecze, Sławno County in West Pomeranian Voivodeship (north-west Poland)
- Porechye (Parečča in Belarusian), a village in Grodno Voblast (north-west Belarus)
