= Domaszowice, Świętokrzyskie Voivodeship =

Domaszowice
- Village
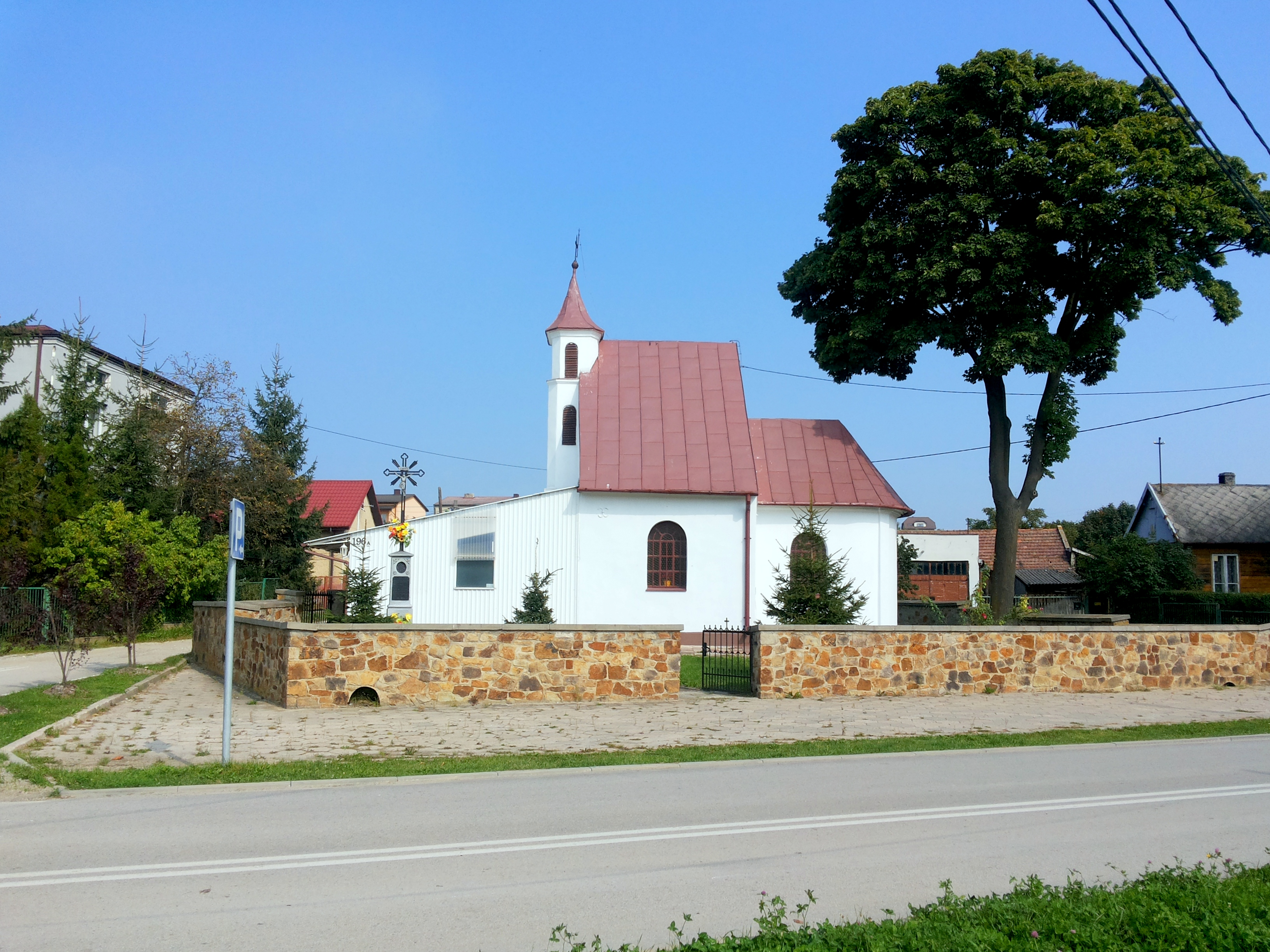
- Chapel of Our Lady of Częstochowa

- Location within Poland
- Coordinates: 50°51′57″N 20°40′59″E
- Country: Poland
- Voivodeship: Świętokrzyskie
- County: Kielce
- Gmina: Masłów
- Population: 1,003

Domaszowice [dɔmaʂɔˈvit͡sɛ] is a village in the administrative district of Gmina Masłów, within Kielce County, Świętokrzyskie Voivodeship, in south-central Poland. It lies approximately 6 km (4 mi) south-west of Masłów and 6 km (4 mi) south-east of the regional capital Kielce.
