= Kostomłoty Drugie =

- Village
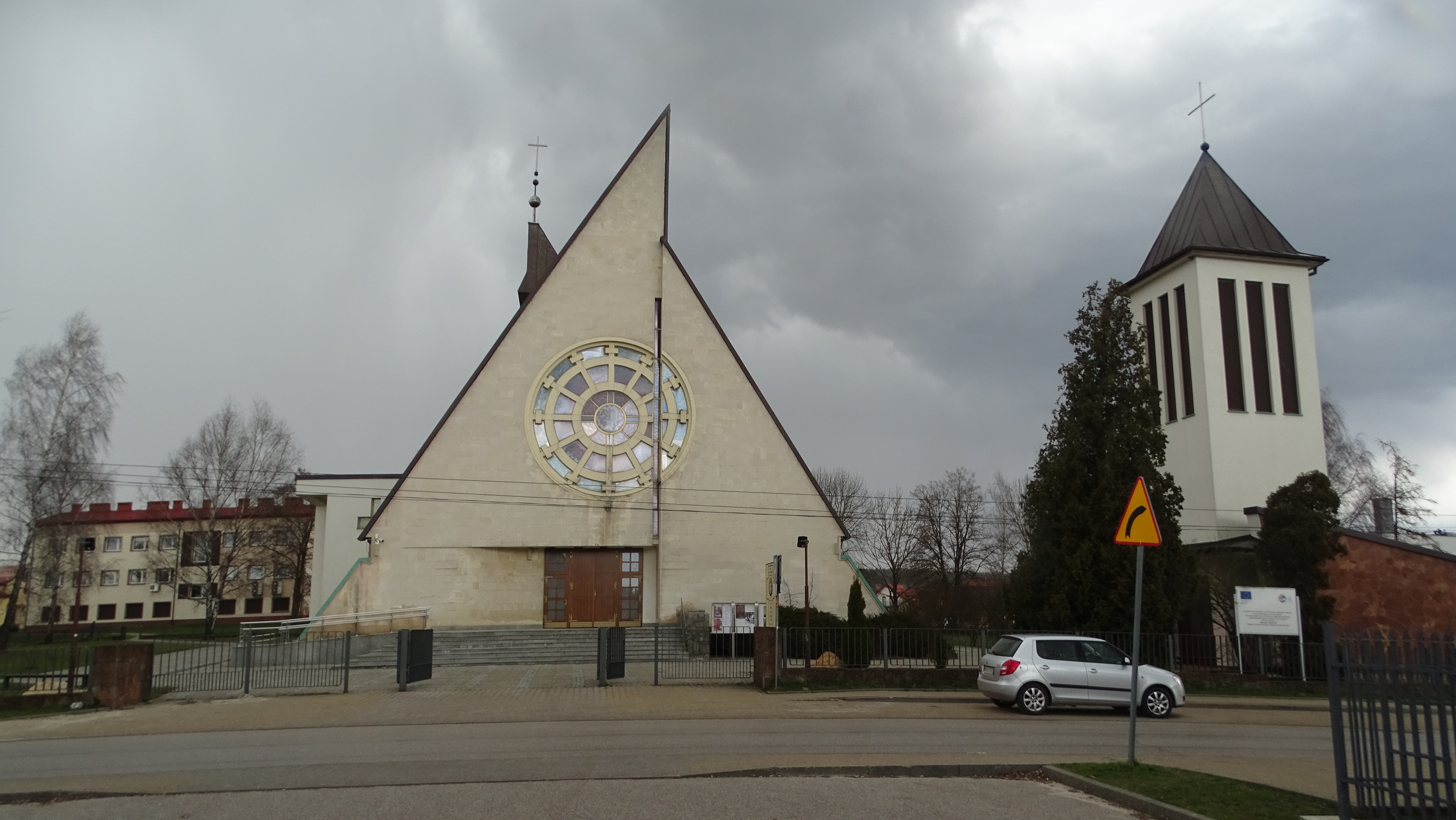
- Catholic church

- Location within Poland
- Coordinates: 50°55′37″N 20°35′29″E
- Country: Poland
- Voivodeship: Świętokrzyskie
- County: Kielce
- Gmina: Miedziana Góra
- Population: 1,684

Kostomłoty Drugie [kɔstɔmˈwɔtɨ ˈdruɡʲɛ] is a village in the administrative district of Gmina Miedziana Góra, within Kielce County, Świętokrzyskie Voivodeship, in south-central Poland. It lies approximately 2 km (1 mi) east of Miedziana Góra and 6 km (4 mi) north of the regional capital Kielce.
