= Ameliówka =

- Village
- Location within Poland
- Coordinates: 50°53′51″N 20°46′50″E
- Country: Poland
- Voivodeship: Świętokrzyskie
- County: Kielce
- Gmina: Masłów
- Elevation: 270 m (890 ft)

Ameliówka [amɛˈljufka] is a village in the administrative district of Gmina Masłów, within Kielce County, Świętokrzyskie Voivodeship, in south-central Poland.
