= Kostomłoty Pierwsze =

- Village
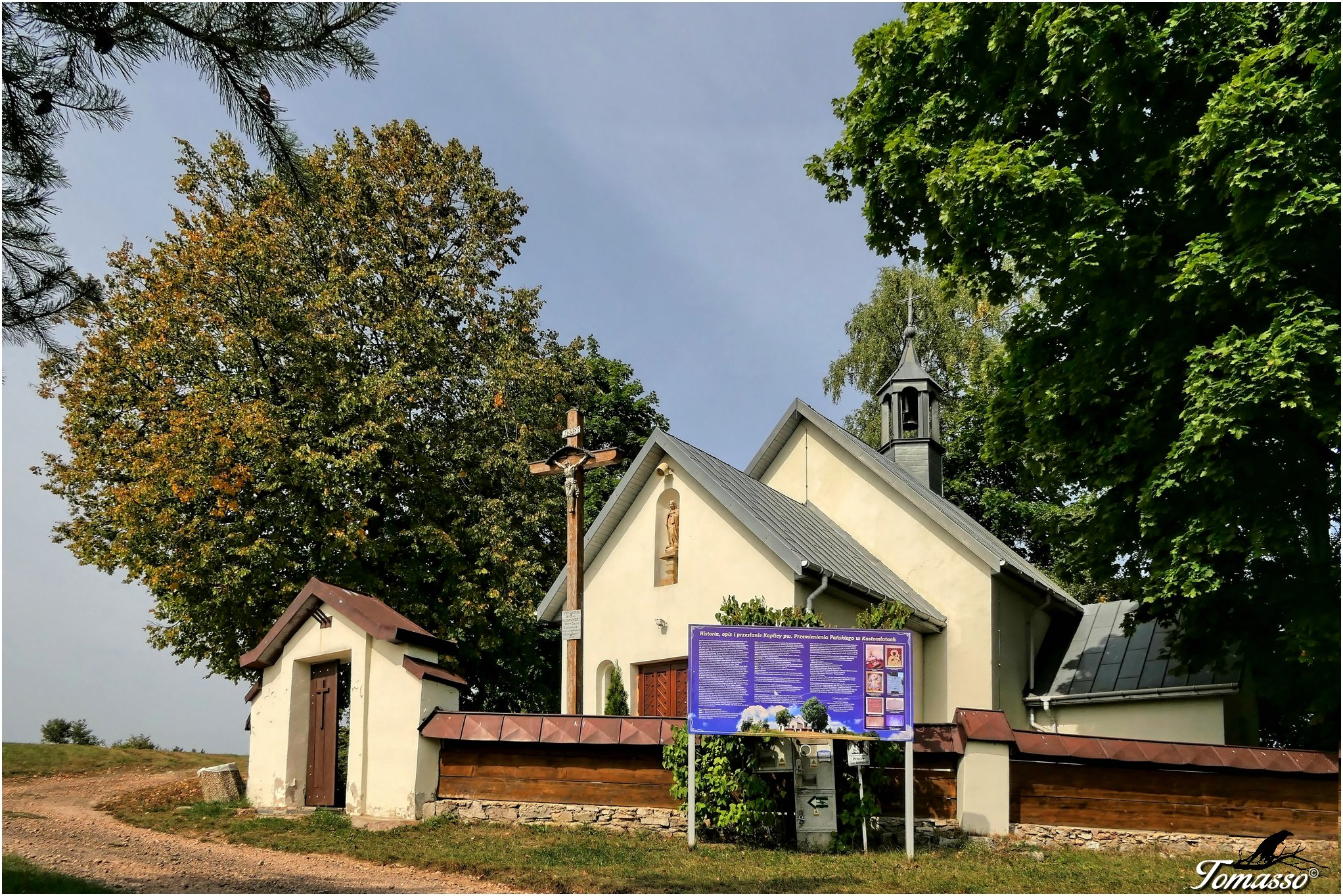
- Chapel

- Location within Poland
- Coordinates: 50°55′4″N 20°35′24″E
- Country: Poland
- Voivodeship: Świętokrzyskie
- County: Kielce
- Gmina: Miedziana Góra
- Population: 1,954

Kostomłoty Pierwsze [kɔstɔmˈwɔtɨ ˈpjɛrfʂɛ] is a village in the administrative district of Gmina Miedziana Góra, within Kielce County, Świętokrzyskie Voivodeship, in south-central Poland. It lies approximately 3 km (2 mi) south-east of Miedziana Góra and 5 km (3 mi) north-west of the regional capital Kielce.
