= Masłów Drugi =

- Village
- Location within Poland
- Coordinates: 50°54′57″N 20°43′58″E
- Country: Poland
- Voivodeship: Świętokrzyskie
- County: Kielce
- Gmina: Masłów
- Population: 912
- Website: http://www.maslow.info.pl

Masłów Drugi [ˈmaswuf ˈdruɡi] is a village in the administrative district of Gmina Masłów, within Kielce County, Świętokrzyskie Voivodeship, in south-central Poland. It lies approximately 2 km (1 mi) north-east of Masłów and 9 km (6 mi) north-east of the regional capital Kielce.
