= Barcza, Poland =

Barcza
- Village
- Location within Poland
- Coordinates: 50°56′34″N 20°45′53″E
- Country: Poland
- Voivodeship: Świętokrzyskie
- County: Kielce
- Gmina: Masłów
- Population: 331

Barcza [ˈbart͡ʂa] is a village in the administrative district of Gmina Masłów, within Kielce County, Świętokrzyskie Voivodeship in south-central Poland. It lies approximately 5 km (3 mi) north-east of Masłów and 13 km (8 mi) north-east of the regional capital Kielce.
