= Cisów-Orłowiny Landscape Park =

Polish national park

Coordinates: 50°44′58″N 20°55′08″E

- Cisowsko-Orłowiński Park Krajobrazowy
- IUCN category V (protected landscape/seascape)
- Interactive map of Cisów-Orłowiny Landscape Park
- Location: Świętokrzyskie Voivodeship
- Area: 207.06 km^{2} (79.95 sq mi)

Cisów-Orłowiny Landscape Park (Cisowsko-Orłowiński Park Krajobrazowy) is a protected area (Landscape Park) in south-central Poland, covering an area of 207.06 square kilometres (79.95 sq mi).

The Park lies within Świętokrzyskie Voivodeship, in Kielce County (Gmina Bieliny, Gmina Daleszyce, Gmina Górno, Gmina Łagów, Gmina Pierzchnica, Gmina Raków).

Within the Landscape Park are four nature reserves.

In the park, in the "Zamczysko" forest reserve, there is a pagan sanctuary with earth embankments and terraces.
