= Cedzyna =

- Village
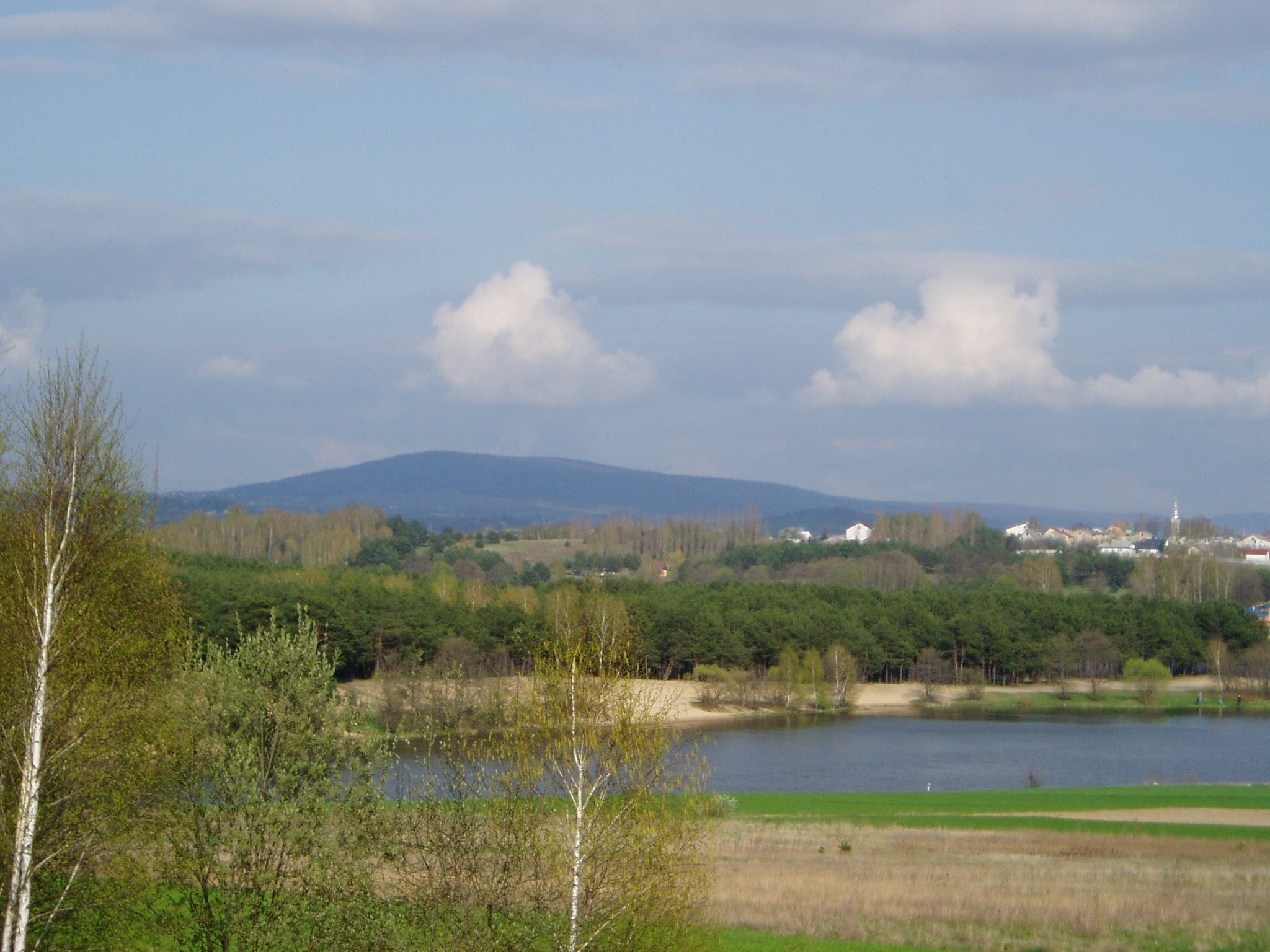

- Location within Poland
- Coordinates: 50°51′51″N 20°42′44″E
- Country: Poland
- Voivodeship: Świętokrzyskie
- County: Kielce
- Gmina: Górno
- Population: 830

Cedzyna [t͡sɛˈd͡zɨna] is a village in the administrative district of Gmina Górno, within Kielce County, Świętokrzyskie Voivodeship, in south-central Poland. It lies approximately 9 km (6 mi) west of Górno and 8 km (5 mi) east of the regional capital Kielce.
