= Radostowa =

Mountain in Poland

Coordinates: 50°54′N 20°49′E

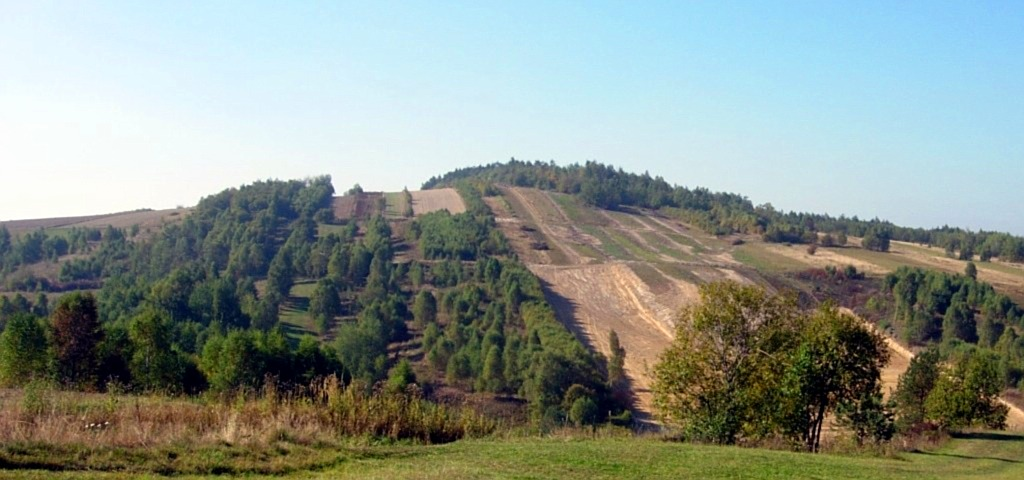
Mount Radostowa, Holy Cross Mountains

Radostowa is a hill, 451 metres high, in the Łysogóry range of the Polish Holy Cross Mountains. At the foot of Radostowa lies Ciekoty, a home village of a famous Polish writer Stefan Żeromski.

The name of the hill is similar to that of a Czech mountain Radhošť. Both names were probably derived from the Slavic god of hospitality, Radhost. The hill's name was used as a title for a regional literature magazine, Radostowa.
