= Gmina Masłów =

Gmina Masłów Masłów Commune
- Gmina
- Coat of arms
- Interactive map of Gmina Masłów
- Coordinates (Masłów): 50°54′24″N 20°43′35″E
- Country: Poland
- Voivodeship: Świętokrzyskie
- County: Kielce County
- Seat: Masłów

Area
  - Total: 86.27 km^{2} (33.31 sq mi)

Population (2006)
  - Total: 9,595
  - Density: 111.2/km^{2} (288.1/sq mi)
- Website: http://www.maslow.pl/

Gmina Masłów is a rural gmina (administrative district) in Kielce County, Świętokrzyskie Voivodeship, in south-central Poland. Its seat is the village of Masłów, which lies approximately 9 kilometres (6 mi) east of the regional capital Kielce.

The gmina covers an area of 86.27 square kilometres (33.3 sq mi), and as of 2006 its total population is 9,595.

== Villages ==
Gmina Masłów contains the villages and settlements of Ameliówka, Barcza, Brzezinki, Ciekoty, Dąbrowa, Dolina Marczakowa, Domaszowice, Mąchocice Kapitulne, Mąchocice-Scholasteria, Masłów, Masłów Drugi, Wiśniówka and Wola Kopcowa.

== Neighbouring gminas ==
Gmina Masłów is bordered by the city of Kielce and by the gminas of Bodzentyn, Górno, Łączna, Miedziana Góra and Zagnańsk.
