= Gmina Miedziana Góra =

Rural district in Kielce County, Poland

Gmina Miedziana Góra Miedziana Góra Commune
- Gmina
- Coat of arms

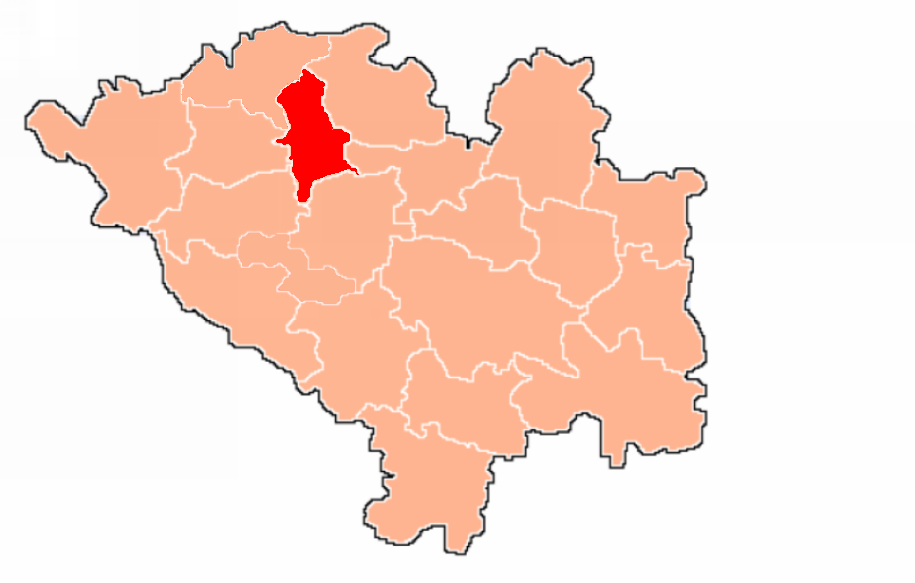
- Coordinates (Miedziana Góra): 50°55′53″N 20°33′56″E
- Country: Poland
- Voivodeship: Świętokrzyskie
- County: Kielce County
- Seat: Miedziana Góra

Government
  - wójt: Damian Sławski

Area
  - Total: 70.84 km^{2} (27.35 sq mi)

Population (2024)
  - Total: 12,563
  - Density: 177.3/km^{2} (459.3/sq mi)
- Website: www.miedziana-gora.pl

Gmina Miedziana Góra is a rural gmina (administrative district) in Kielce County, Świętokrzyskie Voivodeship, in south-central Poland. Its seat is the village of Miedziana Góra, which lies approximately 7 kilometres (4 mi) north-west of the regional capital Kielce.

The gmina covers an area of 70.84 square kilometres (27.4 sq mi), and as of 2007 its total population is 10,090.

The gmina contains part of the protected area called Suchedniów-Oblęgorek Landscape Park.

== Villages ==
Gmina Miedziana Góra contains the villages and settlements of Bobrza, Ciosowa, Ćmińsk, Kostomłoty Drugie, Kostomłoty Pierwsze, Miedziana Góra, Porzecze, Przyjmo, Tumlin-Podgród and Tumlin-Wykień.

== Neighbouring gminas ==
Gmina Miedziana Góra is bordered by the city of Kielce and by the gminas of Masłów, Mniów, Piekoszów, Strawczyn and Zagnańsk.
