= Barcza (surname) =

Barcza is a surname. Notable people with the surname include:

- Attila Barcza (born 1985). Hungarian politician
- Elemér von Barcza (1904–1987), Hungarian equestrian
- Gedeon Barcza (1911–1986), Hungarian chess grandmaster
- Miklós Barcza (1908–1948), Hungarian ice hockey player
- Peter Barcza (born 1949), Canadian operatic baritone
- Arthus Barcza, undercover alias of Anatoly Gurevich, Soviet World War II spy in Germany
