= Gmina Górno =

Gmina Górno Górno Commune
- Gmina
- Coat of arms
- Interactive map of Gmina Górno
- Coordinates (Górno): 50°50′50″N 20°49′37″E
- Country: Poland
- Voivodeship: Świętokrzyskie
- County: Kielce County
- Seat: Górno

Area
  - Total: 83.26 km^{2} (32.15 sq mi)

Population (2006)
  - Total: 12,943
  - Density: 155.5/km^{2} (402.6/sq mi)
- Website: http://www.gorno.pl

Gmina Górno is a rural gmina (administrative district) in Kielce County, Świętokrzyskie Voivodeship, in south-central Poland. Its seat is the village of Górno, which lies approximately 16 kilometres (10 mi) east of the regional capital Kielce.

The gmina covers an area of 83.26 square kilometres (32.1 sq mi), and as of 2006 its total population is 12,943.

The gmina contains part of the protected area called Cisów-Orłowiny Landscape Park.

== Villages ==
Gmina Górno contains the villages and settlements of Bęczków, Cedzyna, Górno, Górno-Parcele, Krajno Drugie, Krajno Pierwsze, Krajno-Parcele, Krajno-Zagórze, Leszczyny, Podmąchocice, Radlin, Skorzeszyce and Wola Jachowa.

== Neighbouring gminas ==
Gmina Górno is bordered by the city of Kielce and by the gminas of Bieliny, Bodzentyn, Daleszyce and Masłów.
