= Peter Barcza =

Canadian operatic baritone (born 1949)

Peter Barcza (born 23 June 1949) is a Canadian operatic baritone who has had an active international career since the early 1970s. After studies at the University of Toronto, he became a member of the Canadian Opera Company in 1971. The following year he won the Metropolitan Opera regional auditions. He has since appeared with major opera companies throughout the world, including La Monnaie, the New Orleans Opera, the New York City Opera, the Palacio de Bellas Artes, the Paris Opera, the Seattle Opera, and the Vancouver Opera among others. Barcza has appeared in recital and with symphony orchestras across Canada, including the Montreal Symphony, Quebec Symphony, Toronto Symphony and the National Arts Center Orchestra (Ottawa).

== Sources ==
- Peter Barcza at the Encyclopedia of Music in Canada
- Website of Barcza, biography
