= Miedziana Góra, Kielce County =

Miedziana Góra
- Village
- Coat of arms

- Location within Poland
- Coordinates: 50°55′53″N 20°33′56″E
- Country: Poland
- Voivodeship: Świętokrzyskie
- County: Kielce
- Gmina: Miedziana Góra
- Population: 2,987

Miedziana Góra [mjɛˈd͡ʑana ˈɡura] is a village in Kielce County, Świętokrzyskie Voivodeship, in south-central Poland. It is the seat of the gmina (administrative district) called Gmina Miedziana Góra. It lies approximately 7 km (4 mi) northwest of the regional capital of Kielce. Its population is around 3,000.
