= Masłów, Świętokrzyskie Voivodeship =

Masłów Pierwszy
- Village
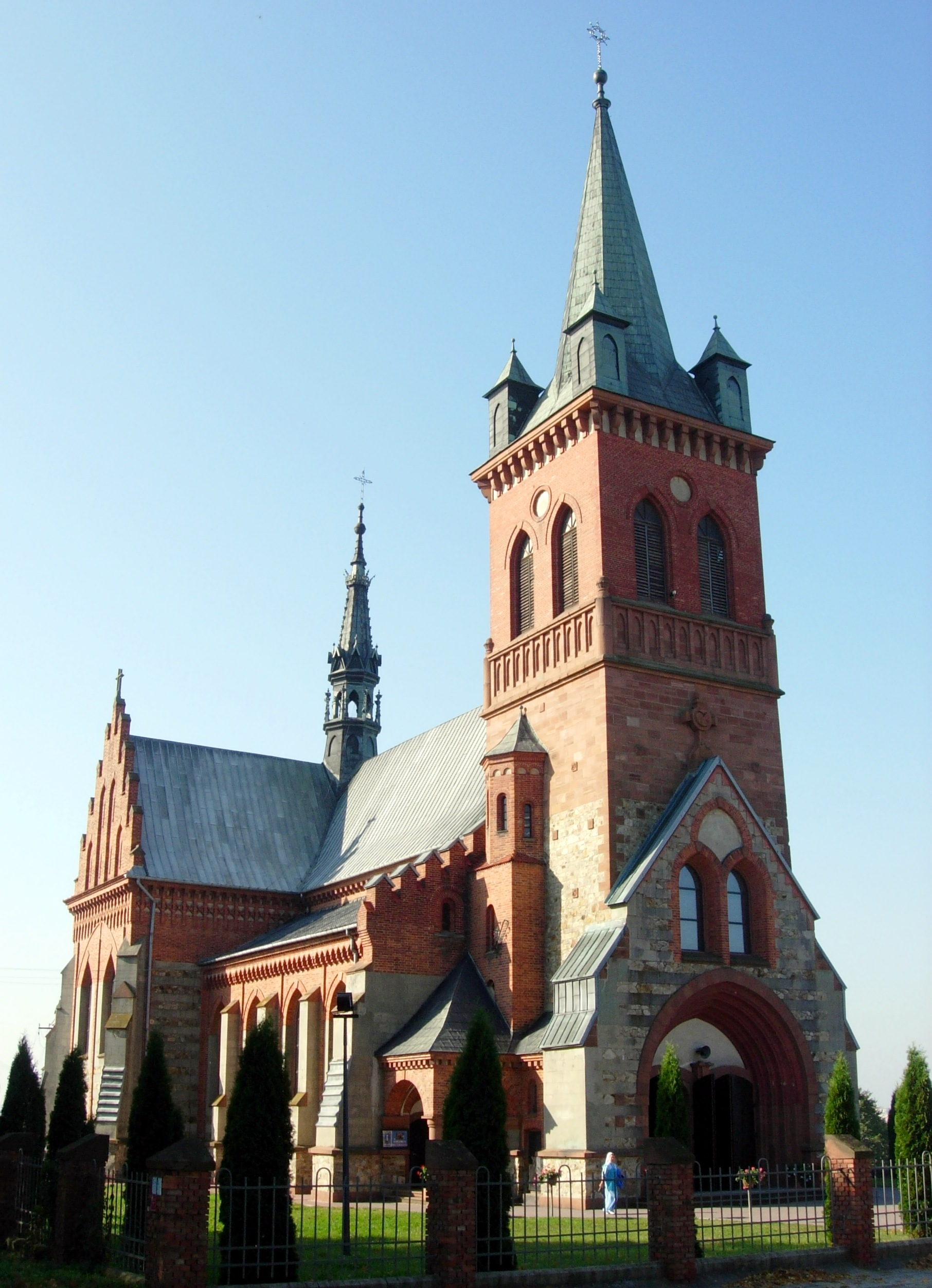

- Coat of arms

- Location within Poland
- Coordinates: 50°54′24″N 20°43′35″E
- Country: Poland
- Voivodeship: Świętokrzyskie
- County: Kielce
- Gmina: Masłów
- Population: 1,528

Masłów [ˈmaswuf] (officially Masłów Pierwszy, Masłów I) is a village in Kielce County, Świętokrzyskie Voivodeship, in south-central Poland. It is the seat of the gmina (administrative district) called Gmina Masłów. It lies approximately 9 km (6 mi) east of the regional capital Kielce. The local church contains a monumental Altar of Transfiguration of Jesus and also Stations of the Cross designed by Józef Gosławski.

There is also a sport airfield Kielce-Masłów Airport.

== See also ==
- Masłów Drugi
