= Górno, Świętokrzyskie Voivodeship =

Górno
- Village
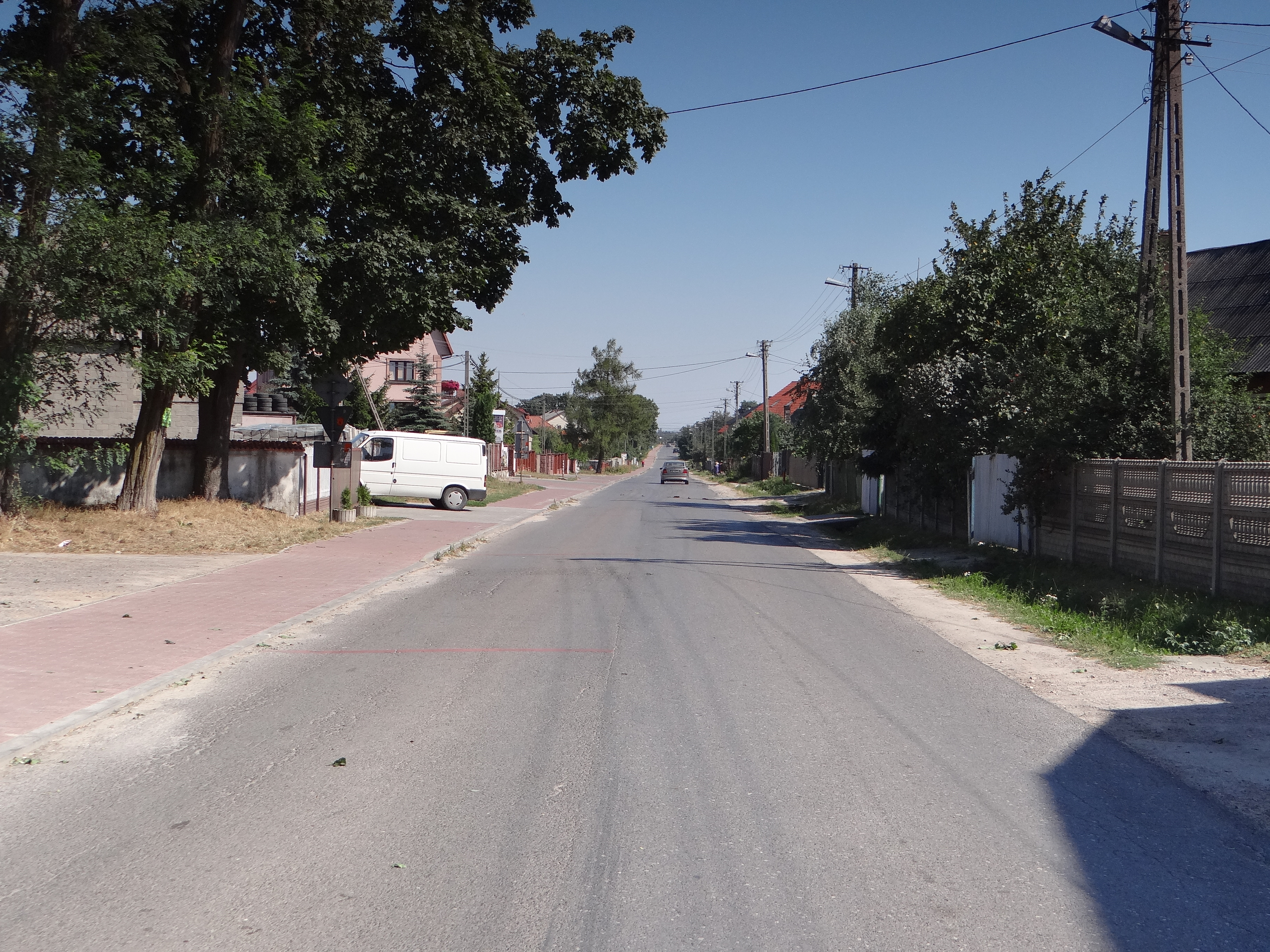

- Coat of arms

- Location within Poland
- Coordinates: 50°50′50″N 20°49′37″E
- Country: Poland
- Voivodeship: Świętokrzyskie
- County: Kielce
- Gmina: Górno
- Population: 1,500

Górno [ˈɡurnɔ] is a village in Kielce County, Świętokrzyskie Voivodeship, in south-central Poland. It is the seat of the gmina (administrative district) called Gmina Górno. It lies approximately 16 km (10 mi) east of the regional capital Kielce.
