= Kielce County =

Kielce County Powiat kielecki
- County
- Flag Coat of arms

- Location within the voivodeship
- Coordinates (Kielce): 50°53′N 20°37′E
- Country: Poland
- Voivodeship: Świętokrzyskie
- Seat: Kielce
- Gminas: Total 19: Gmina Bieliny; Gmina Bodzentyn; Gmina Chęciny; Gmina Chmielnik; Gmina Daleszyce; Gmina Górno; Gmina Łagów; Gmina Łopuszno; Gmina Masłów; Gmina Miedziana Góra; Gmina Mniów; Gmina Morawica; Gmina Nowa Słupia; Gmina Piekoszów; Gmina Pierzchnica; Gmina Raków; Gmina Sitkówka-Nowiny; Gmina Strawczyn; Gmina Zagnańsk

Area
  - Total: 2,247.45 km^{2} (867.75 sq mi)

Population (2019)
  - Total: 206,856
  - Density: 92.0403/km^{2} (238.383/sq mi)
  - Urban: 14,965
  - Rural: 191,891
- Car plates: TKI
- Website: www.powiat.kielce.pl

Kielce County (Polish: powiat kielecki) is a unit of territorial administration and local government (powiat) in Świętokrzyskie Voivodeship, south-central Poland. It came into being on January 1, 1999, as a result of the Polish local government reforms passed in 1998. Its administrative seat is the city of Kielce, although the city is not part of the county (it constitutes a separate city county). The county contains five towns: Chęciny, 14 km (9 mi) south-west of Kielce, Chmielnik, 32 km (20 mi) south of Kielce, Daleszyce, 17 km (11 mi) south-east of Kielce, Bodzentyn, 25 km (16 mi) east of Kielce, Morawica, 13,7 km (8,5 mi) south of Kielce.

The county covers an area of 2,247.45 square kilometres (867.7 sq mi). As of 2019 its total population is 206,856, out of which the population of Chęciny is 4,444, that of Chmielnik is 3,681, that of Daleszyce is 2,896, that of Bodzentyn is 2,233, that of Morawica is 1,711, and the rural population is 191,891.

== Neighbouring counties ==
Apart from the city of Kielce, Kielce County is also bordered by Końskie County to the north, Skarżysko County to the north-east, Starachowice County, Ostrowiec County and Opatów County to the east, Staszów County to the south-east, Busko County and Pińczów County to the south, Jędrzejów County to the south-west, and Włoszczowa County to the west.

== Administrative divisions ==
The county is subdivided into 19 gminas (four urban-rural and 15 rural). These are listed in the following table, in descending order of population.

Gmina	Type	Area (km^{2})	Population (2019)	Seat
Gmina Morawica	urban-rural	140.5	16,639	Morawica
Gmina Piekoszów	rural	102.5	16,453	Piekoszów
Gmina Daleszyce	urban-rural	222.2	15,874	Daleszyce
Gmina Chęciny	urban-rural	127.6	15,096	Chęciny
Gmina Górno	rural	83.3	14,475	Górno
Gmina Zagnańsk	rural	124.4	12,967	Zagnańsk
Gmina Miedziana Góra	rural	70.8	11,535	Miedziana Góra
Gmina Bodzentyn	urban-rural	160.3	11,534	Bodzentyn
Gmina Chmielnik	urban-rural	142.9	11,268	Chmielnik
Gmina Masłów	rural	86.3	11,014	Masłów
Gmina Strawczyn	rural	86.3	10,792	Strawczyn
Gmina Bieliny	rural	88.1	10,277	Bieliny
Gmina Mniów	rural	95.3	9,352	Mniów
Gmina Łopuszno	rural	176.8	9,022	Łopuszno
Gmina Nowa Słupia	rural	85.9	8,131	Nowa Słupia
Gmina Nowiny	rural	45.8	7,889	Nowiny
Gmina Raków	rural	191.1	5,612	Raków
Gmina Łagów	rural	113.0	5,300	Łagów
Gmina Pierzchnica	rural	104.6	3,626	Pierzchnica
