= Ługowo =

Ługowo may refer to the following places:

- Ługowo, Strzelce-Drezdenko County in Lubusz Voivodeship (west Poland)
- Ługowo, Zielona Góra County in Lubusz Voivodeship (west Poland)
- Ługowo, West Pomeranian Voivodeship (north-west Poland)
