= Suchow =

Suchow, Soochow, Su-chow, and Soo-chow are irregular romanizations of various Chinese placenames.

They generally refer to:

- Xuzhou in Jiangsu
- Suzhou in Jiangsu
- Suzhou, Gansu, a former name of Jiuquan in Gansu
- Xuzhou, Sichuan, a former name of Yibin in Sichuan
- Soochow University (Suzhou), Suzhou, China
- Soochow University (Taiwan), in Taipei
- Soochow (crater) on Mars

== Other uses ==
- Suchów in Poland
- "MV Soochow", ship with China Navigation Company of Hong Kong

== See also ==
- Suzhou (disambiguation)
- Xuzhou (disambiguation)
