= Lubiewko =

- Village
- Location within Poland
- Coordinates: 52°58′57″N 15°39′21″E
- Country: Poland
- Voivodeship: Lubusz
- County: Strzelce-Drezdenko
- Gmina: Dobiegniew

Lubiewko [luˈbjɛfkɔ] is a village in the administrative district of Gmina Dobiegniew, within Strzelce-Drezdenko County, Lubusz Voivodeship, in western Poland.
