= Stare Osieczno =

- Village
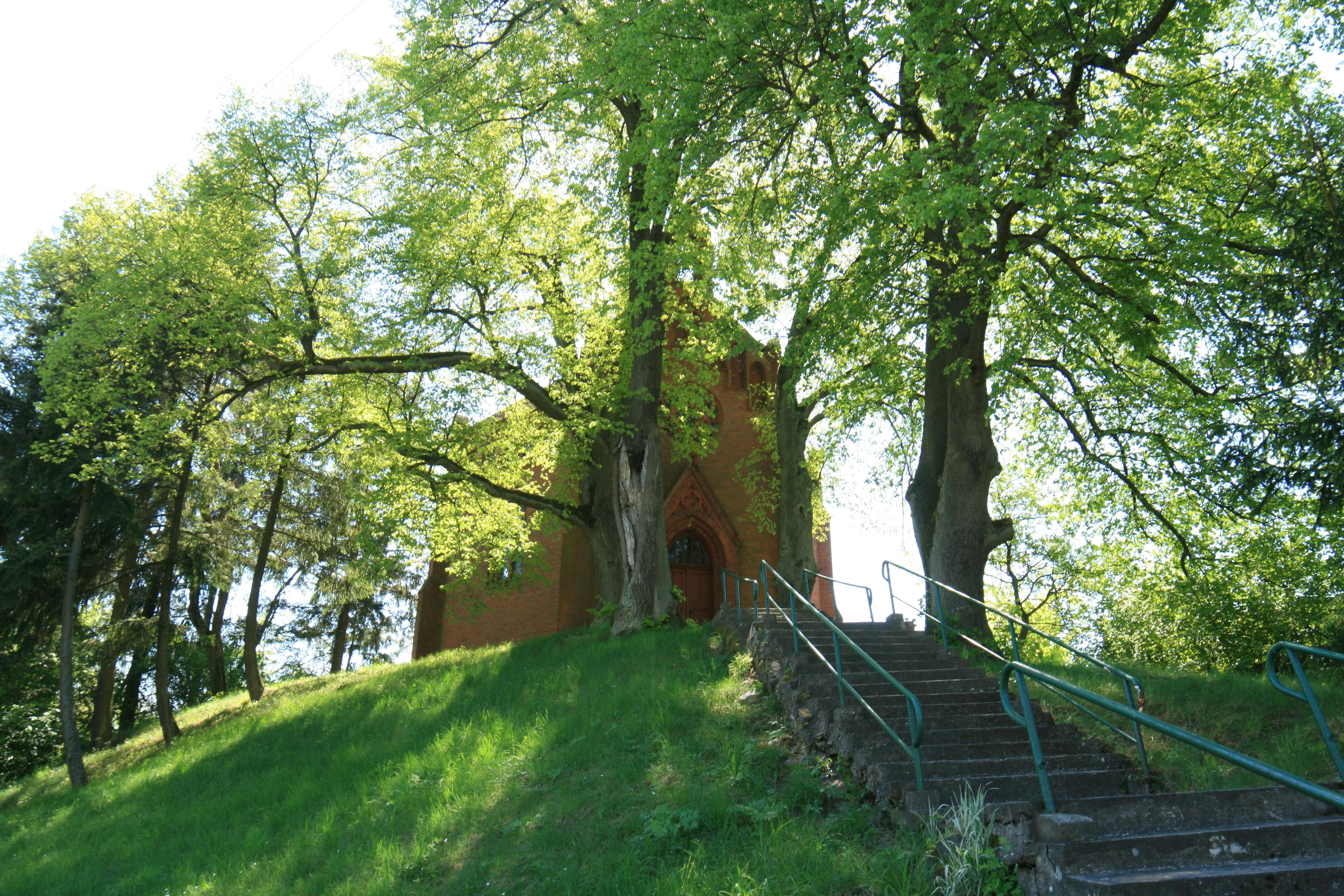
- Church

- Location within Poland
- Coordinates: 53°0′N 15°57′E
- Country: Poland
- Voivodeship: Lubusz
- County: Strzelce-Drezdenko
- Gmina: Dobiegniew
- Population: 120 (2,011)

Stare Osieczno (German: Hochzeit) is a village in the administrative district of Gmina Dobiegniew, within Strzelce-Drezdenko County, Lubusz Voivodeship, in western Poland.

== Notable residents ==
- Friedrich Wilhelm Semmler (1836–1931), German chemist
