= Łęgowo, Strzelce-Drezdenko County =

Łęgowo
- Village
- Location within Poland
- Coordinates: 52°51′N 15°45′E
- Country: Poland
- Voivodeship: Lubusz
- County: Strzelce-Drezdenko
- Gmina: Stare Kurowo

Łęgowo [wɛnˈɡɔvɔ] is a village in the administrative district of Gmina Stare Kurowo, within Strzelce-Drezdenko County, Lubusz Voivodeship, in western Poland.
