= Żeleźnica, Lubusz Voivodeship =

Żeleźnica
- Village
- Location within Poland
- Coordinates: 53°2′45″N 15°55′58″E
- Country: Poland
- Voivodeship: Lubusz
- County: Strzelce-Drezdenko
- Gmina: Dobiegniew

Żeleźnica [ʐɛlɛʑˈnit͡sa] is a village in the administrative district of Gmina Dobiegniew, within Strzelce-Drezdenko County, Lubusz Voivodeship, in western Poland.
