= Głusko =

- Village
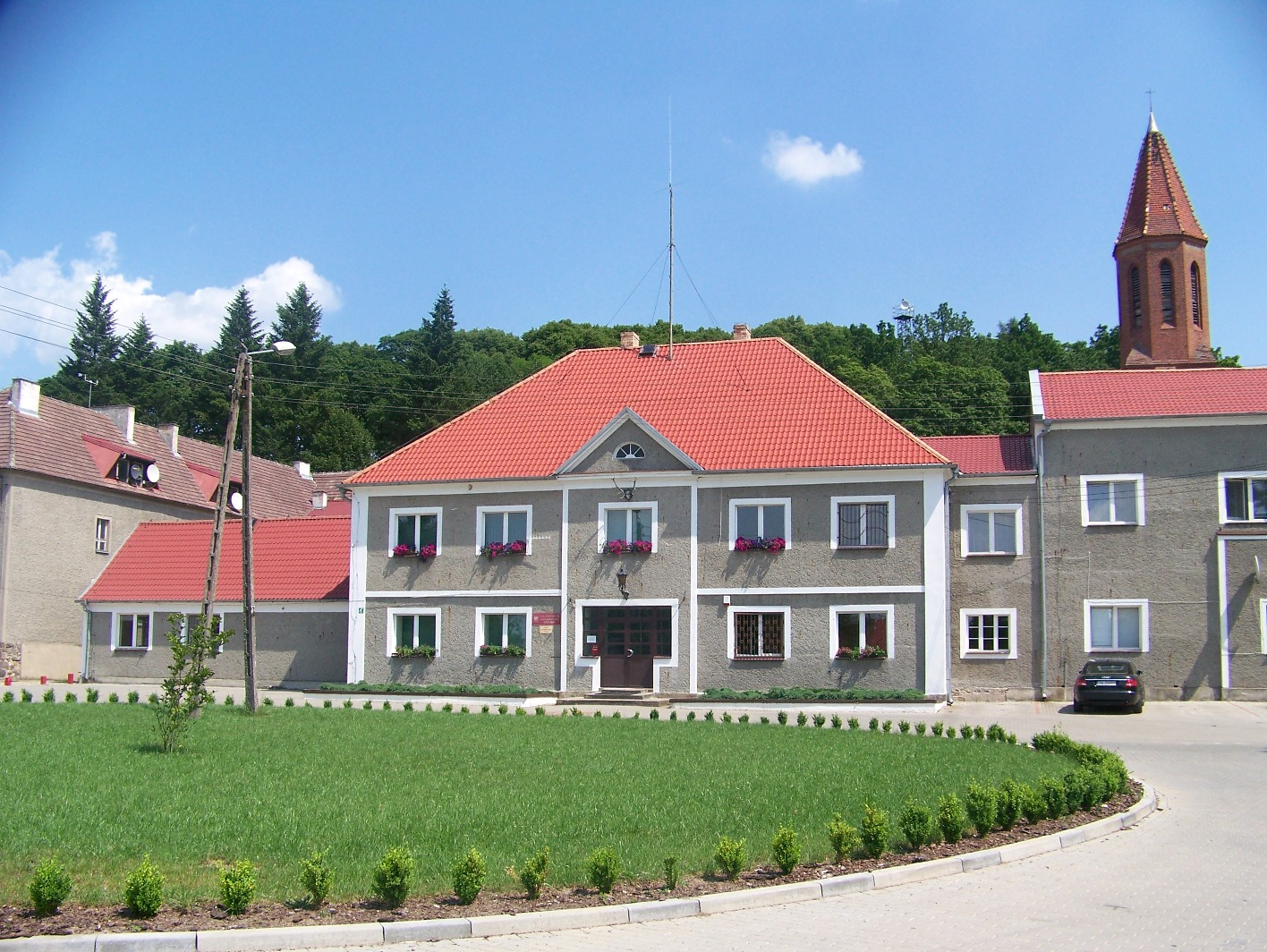

- Location within Poland
- Coordinates: 53°2′N 15°56′E
- Country: Poland
- Voivodeship: Lubusz
- County: Strzelce-Drezdenko
- Gmina: Dobiegniew
- Population: 180

Głusko [ˈɡwuskɔ] (German: Steinbusch) is a village in the administrative district of Gmina Dobiegniew, within Strzelce-Drezdenko County, Lubusz Voivodeship, in western Poland.
