= Dębnik =

Dębnik may refer to the following places:

- Dębnik, Lesser Poland Voivodeship (south Poland)
- Dębnik, Lubusz Voivodeship (west Poland)
- Dębnik, Opole Voivodeship (south-west Poland)
- Dębnik, Pomeranian Voivodeship (north Poland)
- Dębnik, Warmian-Masurian Voivodeship (north Poland)
