= Ługi, Strzelce-Drezdenko County =

Ługi
- Village
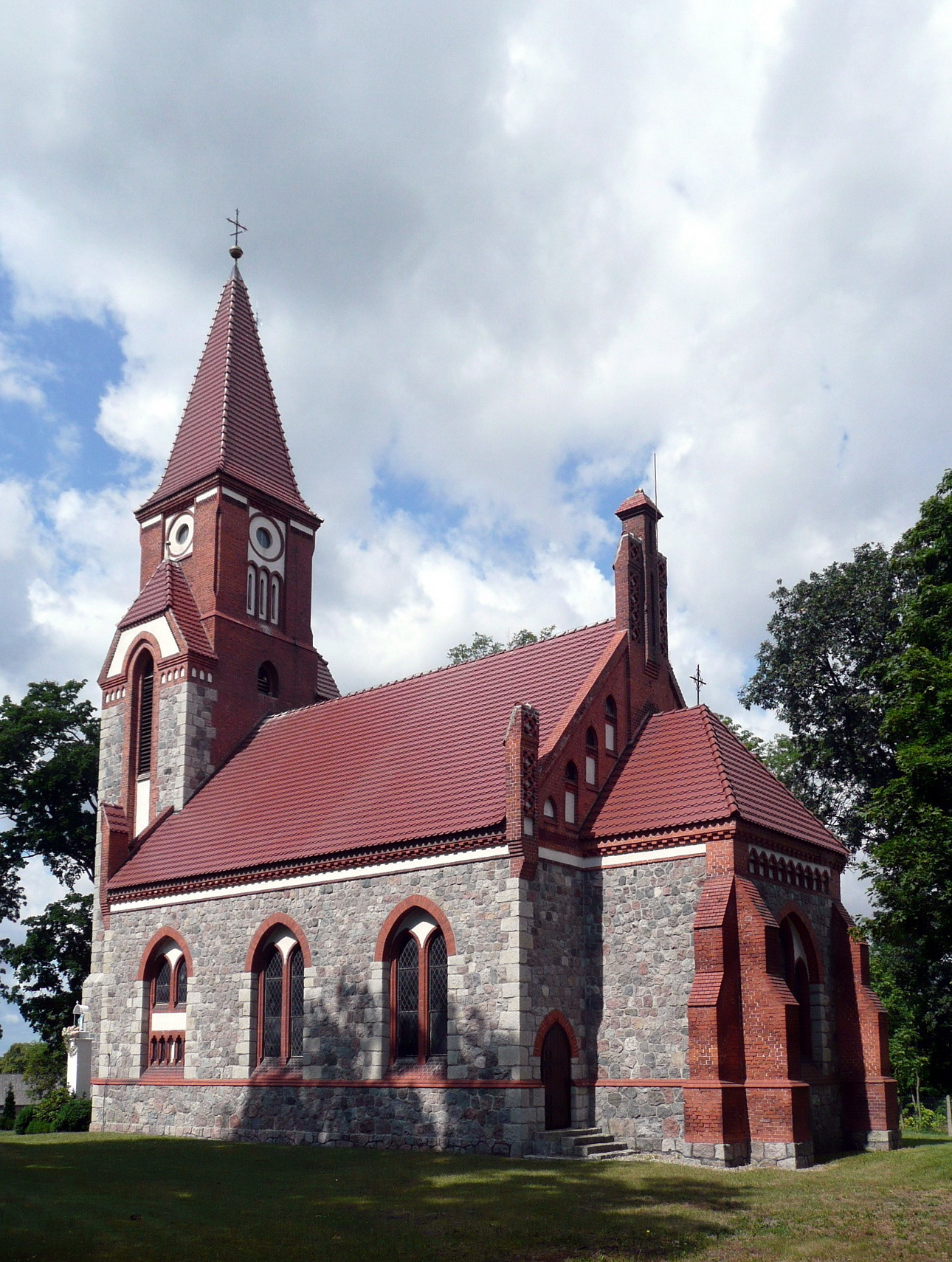
- Orthodox church

- Location within Poland
- Coordinates: 52°57′N 15°42′E
- Country: Poland
- Voivodeship: Lubusz
- County: Strzelce-Drezdenko
- Gmina: Dobiegniew

Ługi [ˈwuɡi] (German: Lauchstädt) is a village in the administrative district of Gmina Dobiegniew, within Strzelce-Drezdenko County, Lubusz Voivodeship, in western Poland.
