= Kovalets =

Kovalets (Ukrainian: Ковалець) is a Ukrainian surname. Notable people with the surname include:

- Kyrylo Kovalets (born 1993), Ukrainian footballer
- Serhiy Kovalets (born 1968), Ukrainian footballer

== See also ==
- Koval (surname)
- Kowalec, a Polish cognate
