= Urszulanka =

- Village
- Location within Poland
- Coordinates: 52°58′26″N 15°43′26″E
- Country: Poland
- Voivodeship: Lubusz
- County: Strzelce-Drezdenko
- Gmina: Dobiegniew

Urszulanka [urʂuˈlanka] is a village in the administrative district of Gmina Dobiegniew, within Strzelce-Drezdenko County, Lubusz Voivodeship, in western Poland.
