= Radachowo =

- Village
- Location within Poland
- Coordinates: 53°4′N 15°51′E
- Country: Poland
- Voivodeship: Lubusz
- County: Strzelce-Drezdenko
- Gmina: Dobiegniew

Radachowo [radaˈxɔvɔ] (German: Heidekavel) is a village in the administrative district of Gmina Dobiegniew, within Strzelce-Drezdenko County, Lubusz Voivodeship, in western Poland.
