= Xuzhou (disambiguation) =

Xuzhou (徐州市) is a modern prefecture-level city in Jiangsu, China.

Xuzhou may also refer to:

- Yibin, formerly known as Xuzhou (叙州)
  - Xuzhou District (叙州区), subdivision of Yibin
- Xuzhou, Zitong County (许州镇), town in Zitong County, Sichuan

== Historical locations ==
- Xuzhou (ancient China) (徐州), one of the Nine Provinces in ancient China
- Xu Prefecture (Jiangsu) (徐州), a prefecture between the 5th and 18th centuries in modern Jiangsu
- Xu Prefecture (Henan) (許州), a prefecture between the 6th and 20th centuries in modern Henan
- Xu Prefecture (Sichuan) (敘州), a prefecture under the Ming and Qing dynasties in modern Sichuan

== See also ==
- Suzhou (disambiguation)
- Suchow (disambiguation)
