= Osowiec, Lubusz Voivodeship =

Osowiec
- Settlement
- Location within Poland
- Coordinates: 52°59′5″N 15°53′32″E
- Country: Poland
- Voivodeship: Lubusz
- County: Strzelce-Drezdenko
- Gmina: Dobiegniew

Osowiec [ɔˈsɔvjɛt͡s] is a settlement in the administrative district of Gmina Dobiegniew, within Strzelce-Drezdenko County, Lubusz Voivodeship, in western Poland.
