= Dębogóra =

Dębogóra may refer to the following places:

- Dębogóra, Czarnków-Trzcianka County in Greater Poland Voivodeship (west-central Poland)
- Dębogóra, Poznań County in Greater Poland Voivodeship (west-central Poland)
- Dębogóra, Kuyavian-Pomeranian Voivodeship (north-central Poland)
- Dębogóra, Szamotuły County in Greater Poland Voivodeship (west-central Poland)
- Dębogóra, Lubusz Voivodeship (west Poland)
- Dębogóra, West Pomeranian Voivodeship (north-west Poland)
