= Niemienica =

- Settlement
- Location within Poland
- Coordinates: 53°05′54″N 15°52′51″E
- Country: Poland
- Voivodeship: Lubusz
- County: Strzelce-Drezdenko
- Gmina: Dobiegniew

Niemienica [ɲɛmjɛnˈnit͡sa] is a settlement in the administrative district of Gmina Dobiegniew, within Strzelce-Drezdenko County, Lubusz Voivodeship, in western Poland.
