= Smolarz, Lubusz Voivodeship =

Smolarz
- Village
- Location within Poland
- Coordinates: 52°52′15″N 15°41′58″E
- Country: Poland
- Voivodeship: Lubusz
- County: Strzelce-Drezdenko
- Gmina: Stare Kurowo
- Population: 30

Smolarz [ˈsmɔlaʂ] is a village in the administrative district of Gmina Stare Kurowo, within Strzelce-Drezdenko County, Lubusz Voivodeship, in western Poland.
