= Grąsy =

- Village
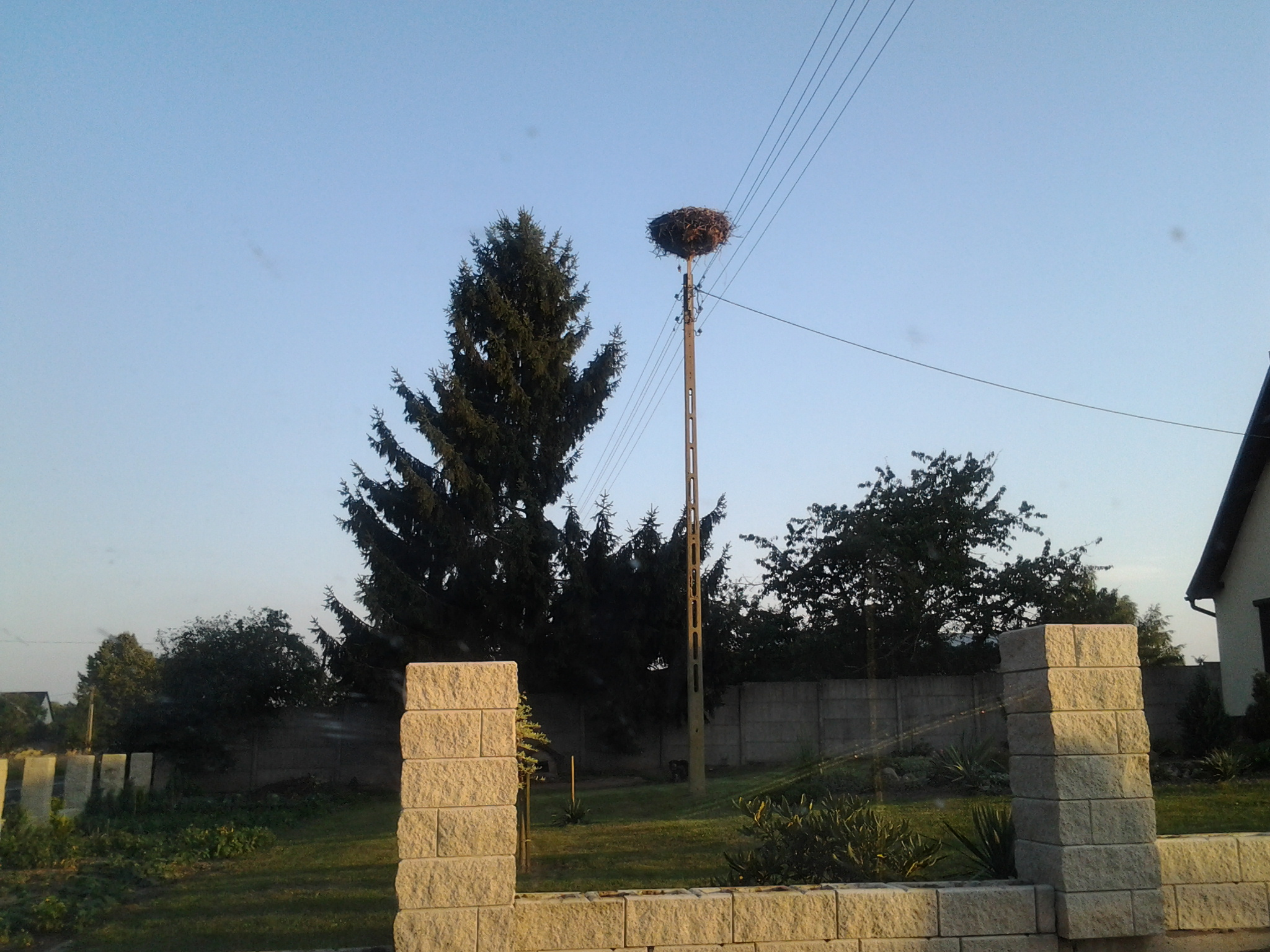

- Location within Poland
- Coordinates: 52°59′N 15°45′E
- Country: Poland
- Voivodeship: Lubusz
- County: Strzelce-Drezdenko
- Gmina: Dobiegniew
- Time zone: UTC+1 (CET)
  - Summer (DST): UTC+2 (CEST)

Grąsy [ˈɡrɔ̃sɨ] is a village in the administrative district of Gmina Dobiegniew, within Strzelce-Drezdenko County, Lubusz Voivodeship, in western Poland.

== History ==
During World War II, the German administration operated a forced labour subcamp of the Stalag II-D prisoner-of-war camp in the village.
