= Nowe Kurowo =

- Village
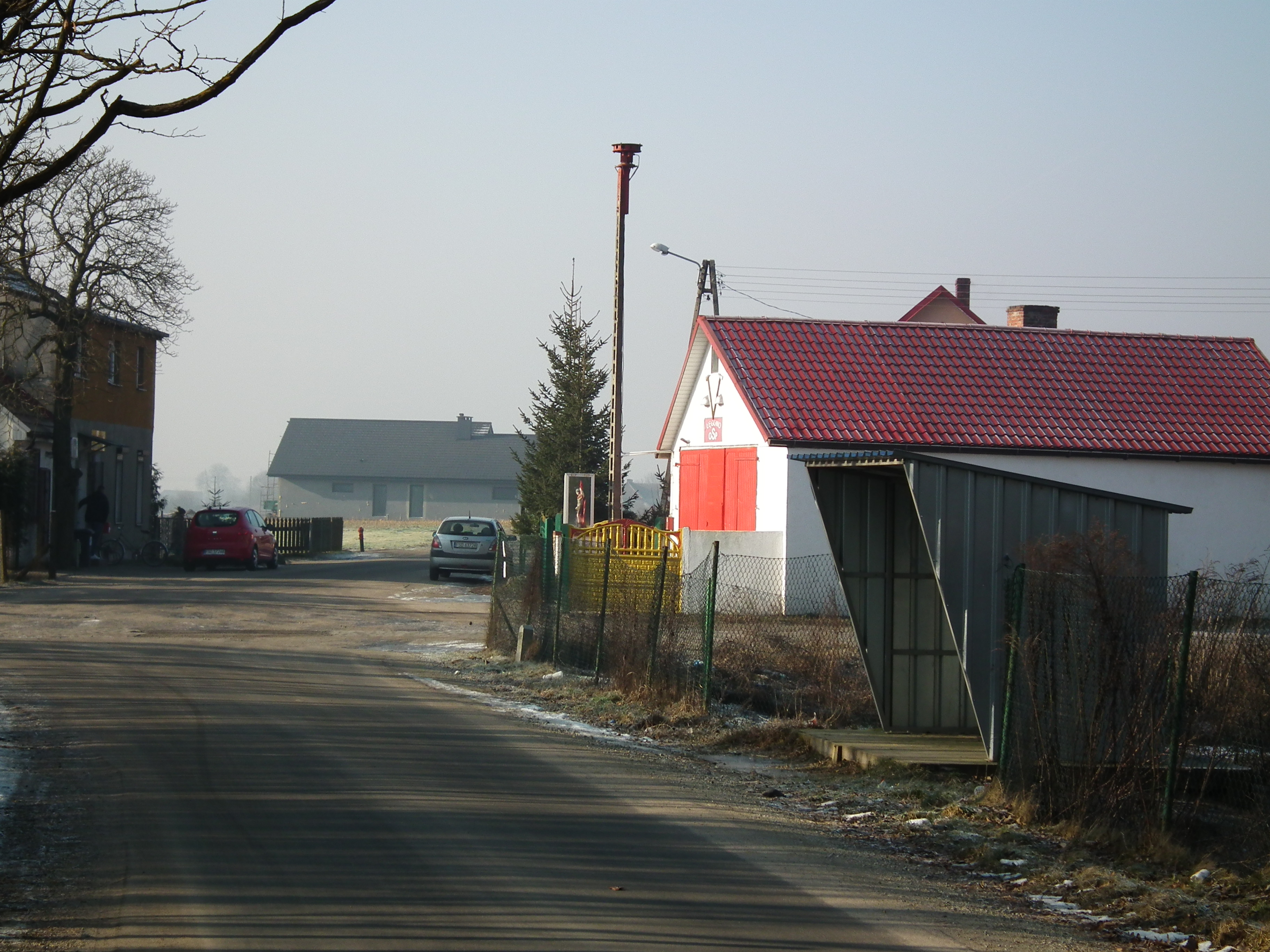

- Location within Poland
- Coordinates: 52°51′N 15°42′E
- Country: Poland
- Voivodeship: Lubusz
- County: Strzelce-Drezdenko
- Gmina: Stare Kurowo

Nowe Kurowo [ˈnɔvɛ kuˈrɔvɔ] is a village in the administrative district of Gmina Stare Kurowo, within Strzelce-Drezdenko County, Lubusz Voivodeship, in western Poland.
