= Niwy, Lubusz Voivodeship =

Niwy
- Village
- Location within Poland
- Coordinates: 52°56′29″N 15°40′6″E
- Country: Poland
- Voivodeship: Lubusz
- County: Strzelce-Drezdenko
- Gmina: Dobiegniew
- Population: 30

Niwy [ˈnivɨ] is a village in the administrative district of Gmina Dobiegniew, within Strzelce-Drezdenko County, Lubusz Voivodeship, in western Poland.
