= Lipinka =

Lipinka may refer to:

- Lipinka (Olomouc District), village and municipality in the Czech Republic.
- Lipinka, Lubusz Voivodeship, village in Poland
- Lipinka, Pomeranian Voivodeship, village in Poland
