= Radęcin =

- Village
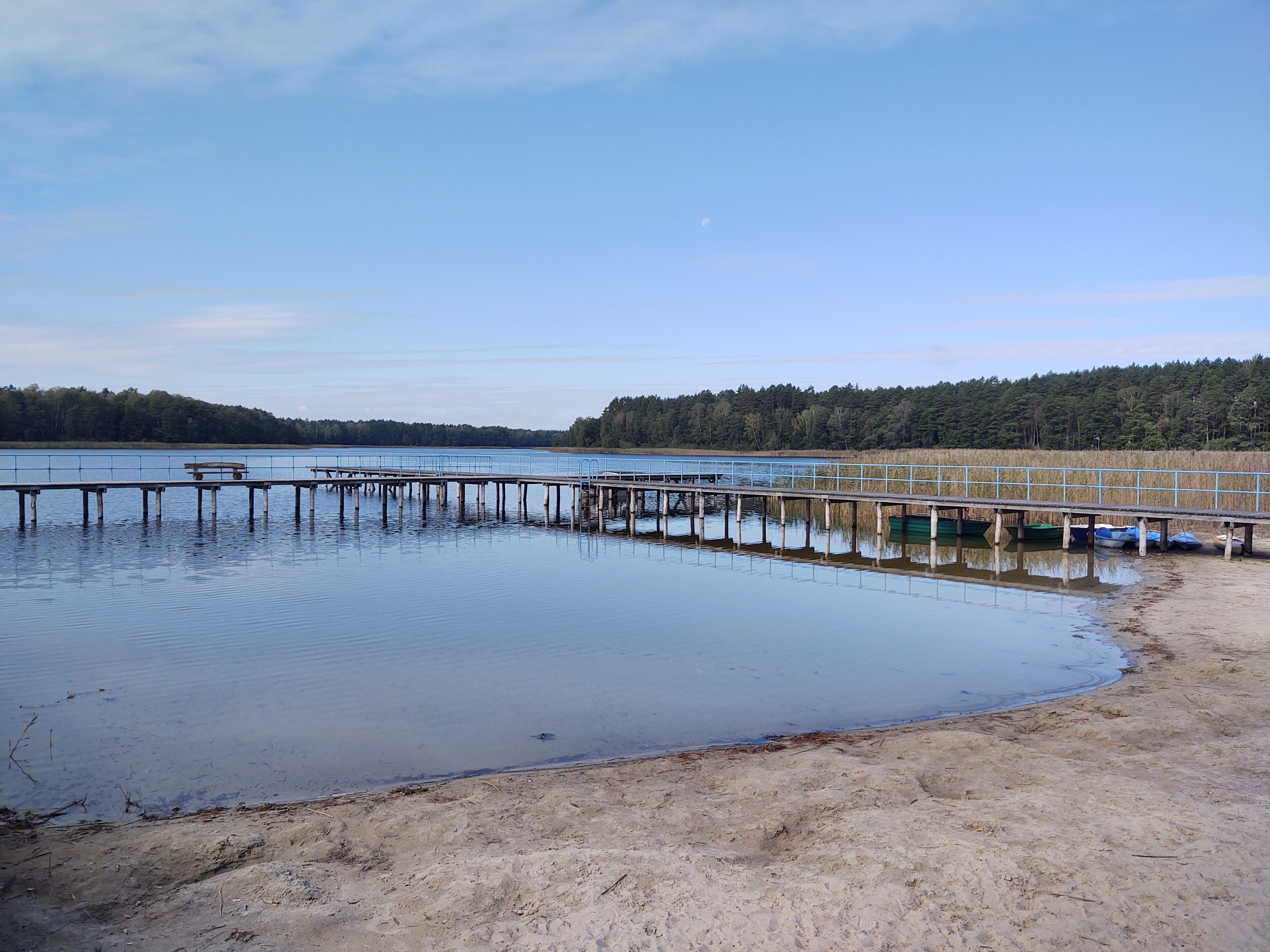
- Lake

- Location within Poland
- Coordinates: 53°3′N 15°51′E
- Country: Poland
- Voivodeship: Lubusz
- County: Strzelce-Drezdenko
- Gmina: Dobiegniew

Radęcin [raˈdɛnt͡ɕin] is a village in the administrative district of Gmina Dobiegniew, within Strzelce-Drezdenko County, Lubusz Voivodeship, in western Poland.
