= Pławin, Lubusz Voivodeship =

Pławin
- Village
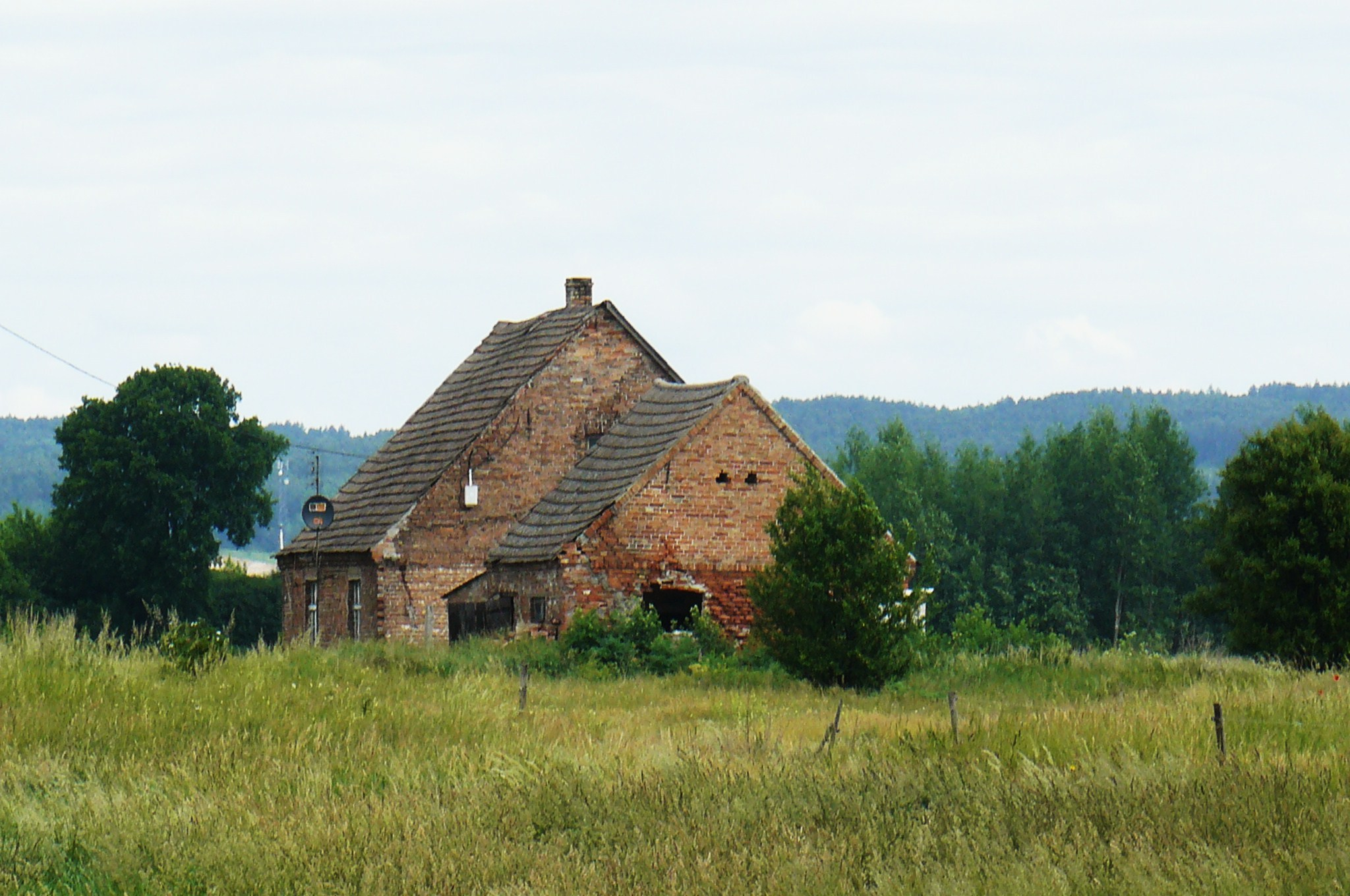
- Building in Pławin, Lubusz Voivodeship

- Location within Poland
- Coordinates: 52°49′05″N 15°39′58″E
- Country: Poland
- Voivodeship: Lubusz
- County: Strzelce-Drezdenko
- Gmina: Stare Kurowo

Pławin [ˈpwavin] is a village in the administrative district of Gmina Stare Kurowo, within Strzelce-Drezdenko County, Lubusz Voivodeship, in western Poland.
