= Starczewo, Lubusz Voivodeship =

Starczewo
- Village
- Location within Poland
- Coordinates: 52°59′52″N 15°47′15″E
- Country: Poland
- Voivodeship: Lubusz
- County: Strzelce-Drezdenko
- Gmina: Dobiegniew
- Population: 80

Starczewo [starˈt͡ʂɛvɔ] is a village in the administrative district of Gmina Dobiegniew, within Strzelce-Drezdenko County, Lubusz Voivodeship, in western Poland.
