= Sitnica, Lubusz Voivodeship =

Sitnica
- Village
- Location within Poland
- Coordinates: 53°6′35″N 15°55′28″E
- Country: Poland
- Voivodeship: Lubusz
- County: Strzelce-Drezdenko
- Gmina: Dobiegniew
- Population: 60

Sitnica [ɕitˈnit͡sa] is a village in the administrative district of Gmina Dobiegniew, within Strzelce-Drezdenko County, Lubusz Voivodeship, in western Poland.
