= Rokitno, Strzelce-Drezdenko County =

Rokitno
- Village
- Location within Poland
- Coordinates: 52°52′13″N 15°38′27″E
- Country: Poland
- Voivodeship: Lubusz
- County: Strzelce-Drezdenko
- Gmina: Stare Kurowo

Rokitno [rɔˈkitnɔ] is a village in the administrative district of Gmina Stare Kurowo, within Strzelce-Drezdenko County, Lubusz Voivodeship, in western Poland.
