= Moczele =

- Village
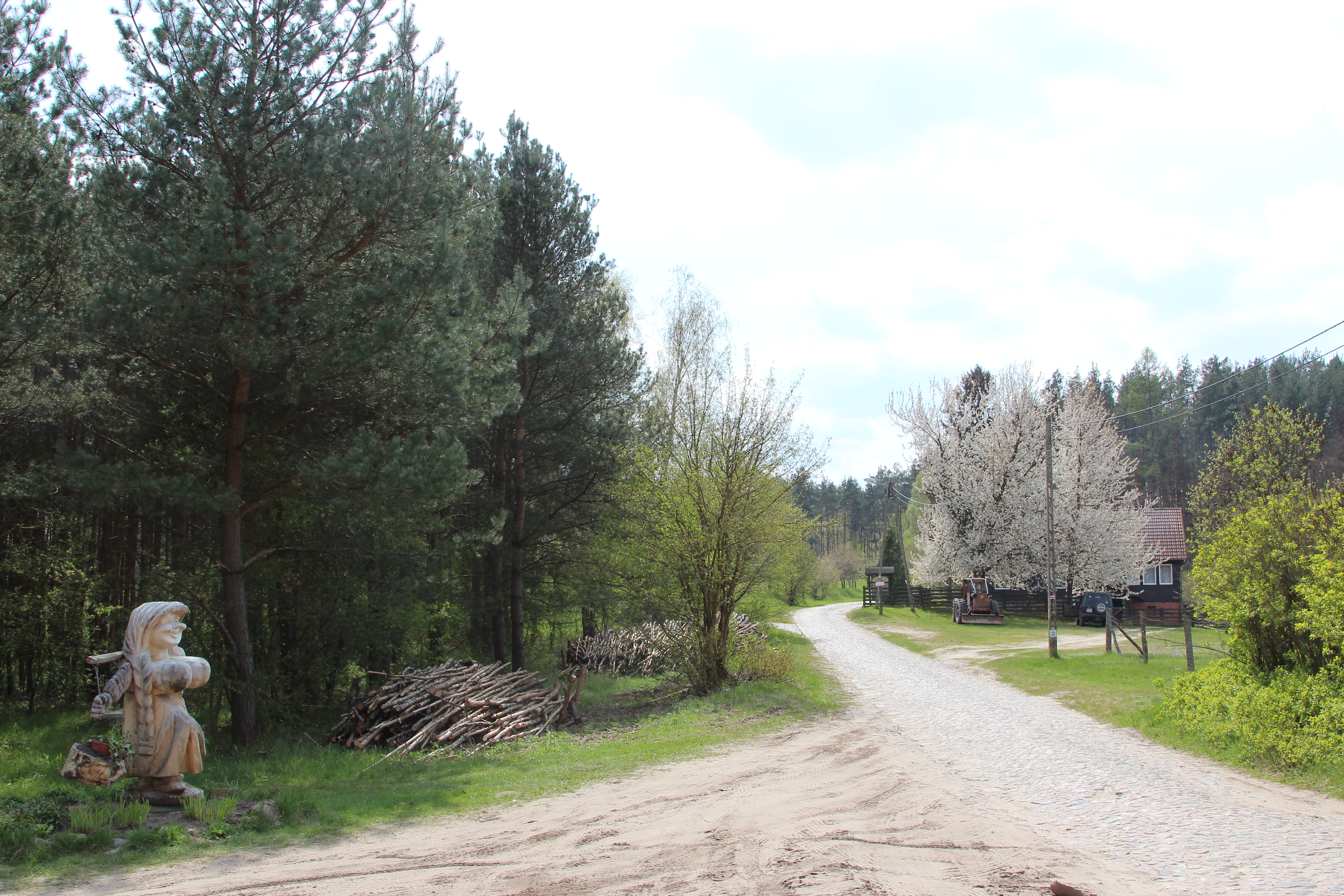

- Location within Poland
- Coordinates: 53°4′48″N 15°54′31″E
- Country: Poland
- Voivodeship: Lubusz
- County: Strzelce-Drezdenko
- Gmina: Dobiegniew

Moczele [mɔˈt͡ʂɛlɛ] is a village in the administrative district of Gmina Dobiegniew, within Strzelce-Drezdenko County, Lubusz Voivodeship, in western Poland.
