= Chrapów =

- Village
- Location within Poland
- Coordinates: 52°58′N 15°50′E
- Country: Poland
- Voivodeship: Lubusz
- County: Strzelce-Drezdenko
- Gmina: Dobiegniew
- Population: 30

Chrapów [ˈxrapuf] is a village in the administrative district of Gmina Dobiegniew, within Strzelce-Drezdenko County, Lubusz Voivodeship, in western Poland.
