= Nowy Młyn, Strzelce-Drezdenko County =

Nowy Młyn
- Settlement
- Location within Poland
- Coordinates: 52°56′57″N 15°47′55″E
- Country: Poland
- Voivodeship: Lubusz
- County: Strzelce-Drezdenko
- Gmina: Dobiegniew

Nowy Młyn [ˈnɔvɨ ˈmwɨn] is a settlement in the administrative district of Gmina Dobiegniew, within Strzelce-Drezdenko County, Lubusz Voivodeship, in western Poland.
