= Ostrowiec-Osada =

- Settlement
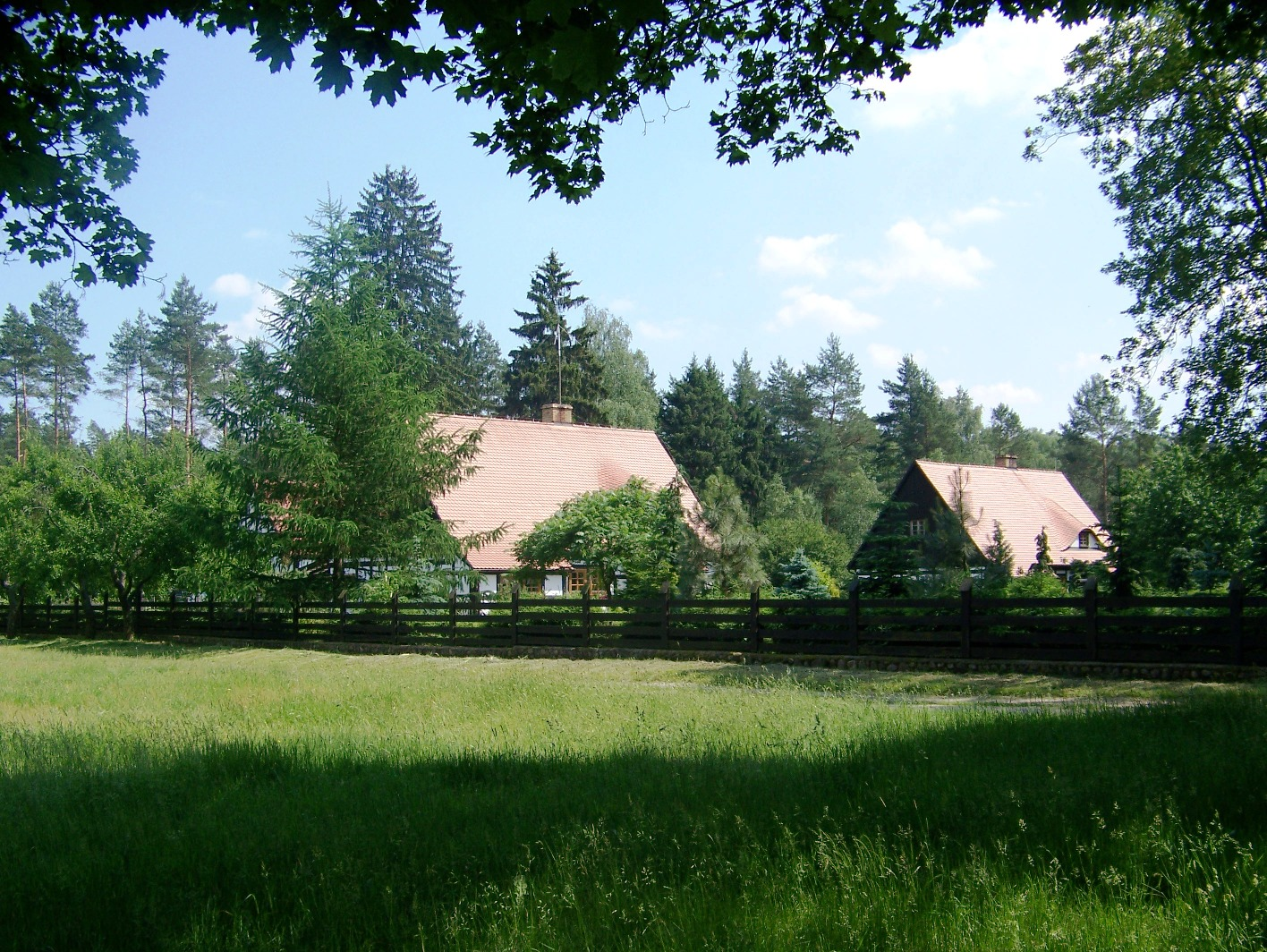
- Osada Ostrowiec DNP.

- Location within Poland
- Coordinates: 53°05′14″N 15°50′56″E
- Country: Poland
- Voivodeship: Lubusz
- County: Strzelce-Drezdenko
- Gmina: Dobiegniew

Ostrowiec-Osada (Polish pronunciation: [ɔsˈtrɔvjɛt͡s ɔˈsada]) is a settlement in the administrative district of Gmina Dobiegniew, within Strzelce-Drezdenko County, Lubusz Voivodeship, in western Poland.
