= Derkacze =

- Village
- Location within Poland
- Coordinates: 53°0′N 15°49′E
- Country: Poland
- Voivodeship: Lubusz
- County: Strzelce-Drezdenko
- Gmina: Dobiegniew

Derkacze [dɛrˈkat͡ʂɛ] is a village in the administrative district of Gmina Dobiegniew, within Strzelce-Drezdenko County, Lubusz Voivodeship, in western Poland.
