= Słonów =

- Village
- Location within Poland
- Coordinates: 52°56′N 15°47′E
- Country: Poland
- Voivodeship: Lubusz
- County: Strzelce-Drezdenko
- Gmina: Dobiegniew

Słonów [ˈswɔnuf] is a village in the administrative district of Gmina Dobiegniew, within Strzelce-Drezdenko County, Lubusz Voivodeship, in western Poland.
