= Łęczyn, Lubusz Voivodeship =

Łęczyn
- Village
- Location within Poland
- Coordinates: 52°58′22″N 15°54′20″E
- Country: Poland
- Voivodeship: Lubusz
- County: Strzelce-Drezdenko
- Gmina: Dobiegniew

Łęczyn [ˈwɛnt͡ʂɨn] is a village in the administrative district of Gmina Dobiegniew, within Strzelce-Drezdenko County, Lubusz Voivodeship, in western Poland.
