= Wilczy Dół =

- Settlement
- Location within Poland
- Coordinates: 52°55′22″N 15°48′41″E
- Country: Poland
- Voivodeship: Lubusz
- County: Strzelce-Drezdenko
- Gmina: Dobiegniew

Wilczy Dół (Polish pronunciation: [ˈviltʂɨ ˈduw]) is a settlement in the administrative district of Gmina Dobiegniew, within Strzelce-Drezdenko County, Lubusz Voivodeship, in western Poland.
