= Ostrowite, Lubusz Voivodeship =

Ostrowite
- Settlement
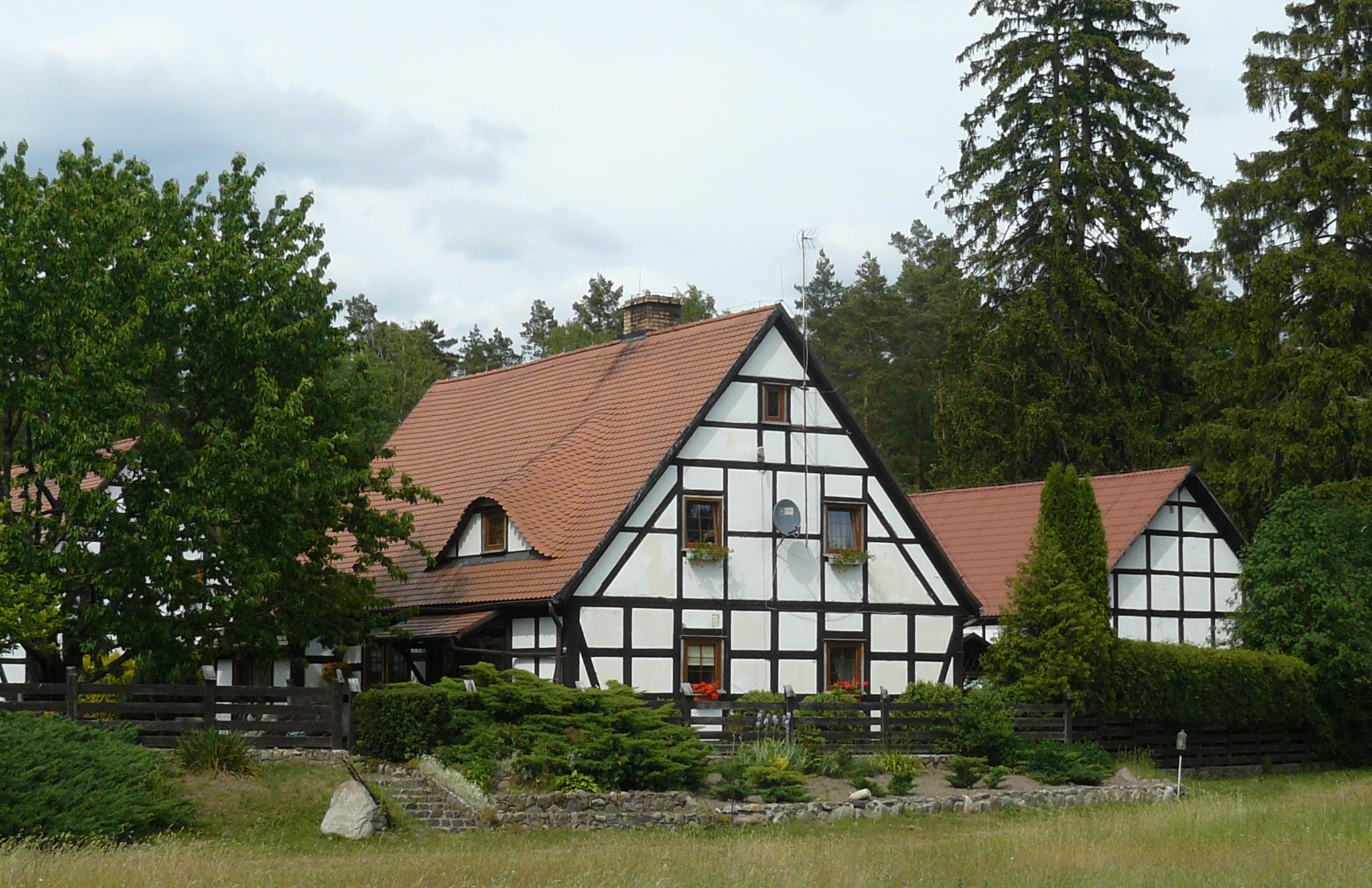

- Location within Poland
- Coordinates: 53°4′12″N 15°58′31″E
- Country: Poland
- Voivodeship: Lubusz
- County: Strzelce-Drezdenko
- Gmina: Dobiegniew

Ostrowite [ɔstrɔˈvitɛ] is a settlement in the administrative district of Gmina Dobiegniew, within Strzelce-Drezdenko County, Lubusz Voivodeship, in western Poland.
