= Błotnica, Lubusz Voivodeship =

Błotnica
- Village
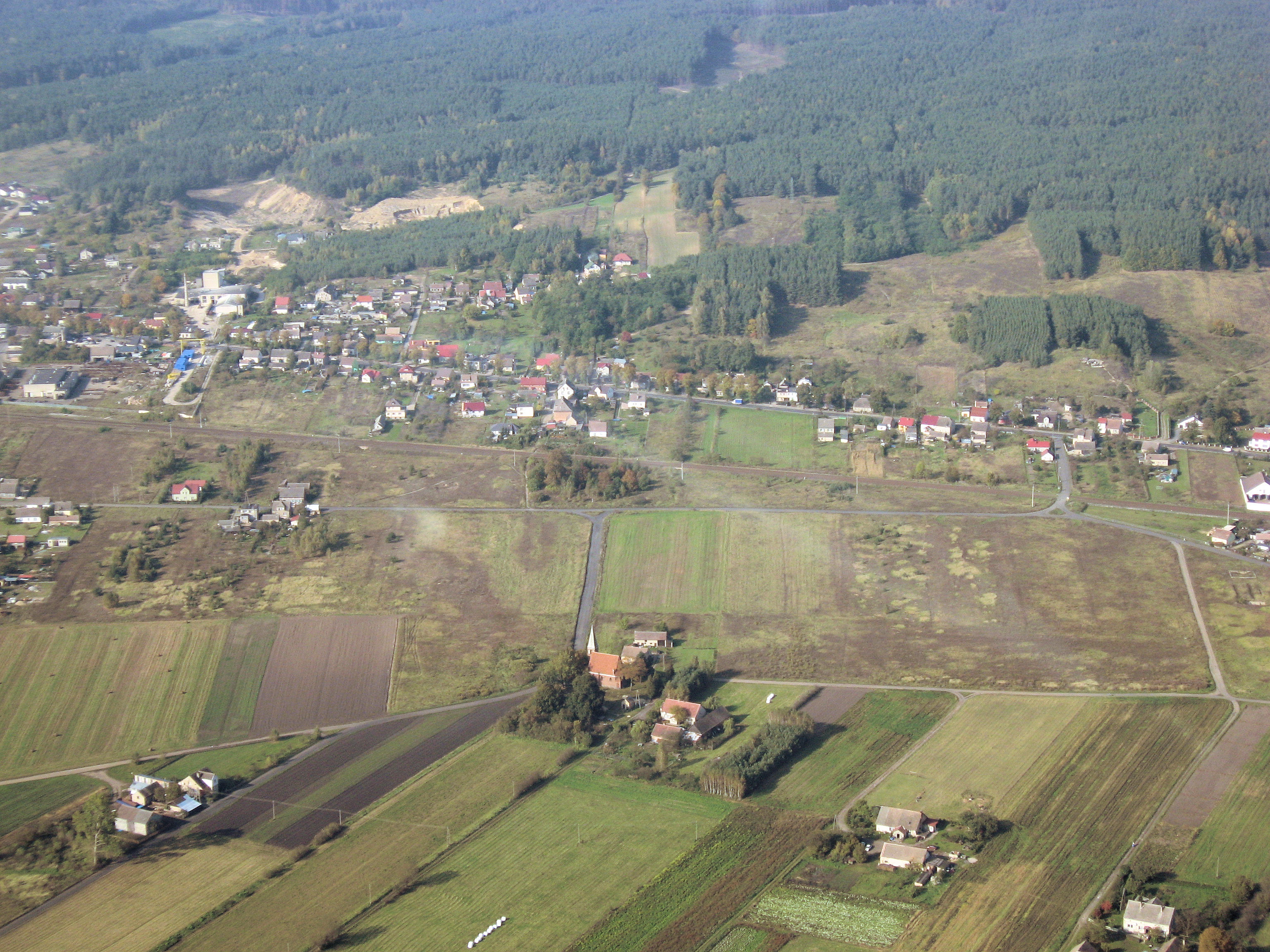

- Location within Poland
- Coordinates: 52°50′31″N 15°40′58″E
- Country: Poland
- Voivodeship: Lubusz
- County: Strzelce-Drezdenko
- Gmina: Stare Kurowo

Błotnica [bwɔtˈnit͡sa] is a village in the administrative district of Gmina Stare Kurowo, within Strzelce-Drezdenko County, Lubusz Voivodeship, in western Poland.
