= Kamienna Knieja =

- Settlement
- Location within Poland
- Coordinates: 53°00′48″N 15°56′55″E
- Country: Poland
- Voivodeship: Lubusz
- County: Strzelce-Drezdenko
- Gmina: Dobiegniew

Kamienna Knieja [kaˈmjɛnna ˈkɲɛja] is a settlement in the administrative district of Gmina Dobiegniew, within Strzelce-Drezdenko County, Lubusz Voivodeship, in western Poland.
