= Osiek, Strzelce-Drezdenko County =

Osiek
- Village
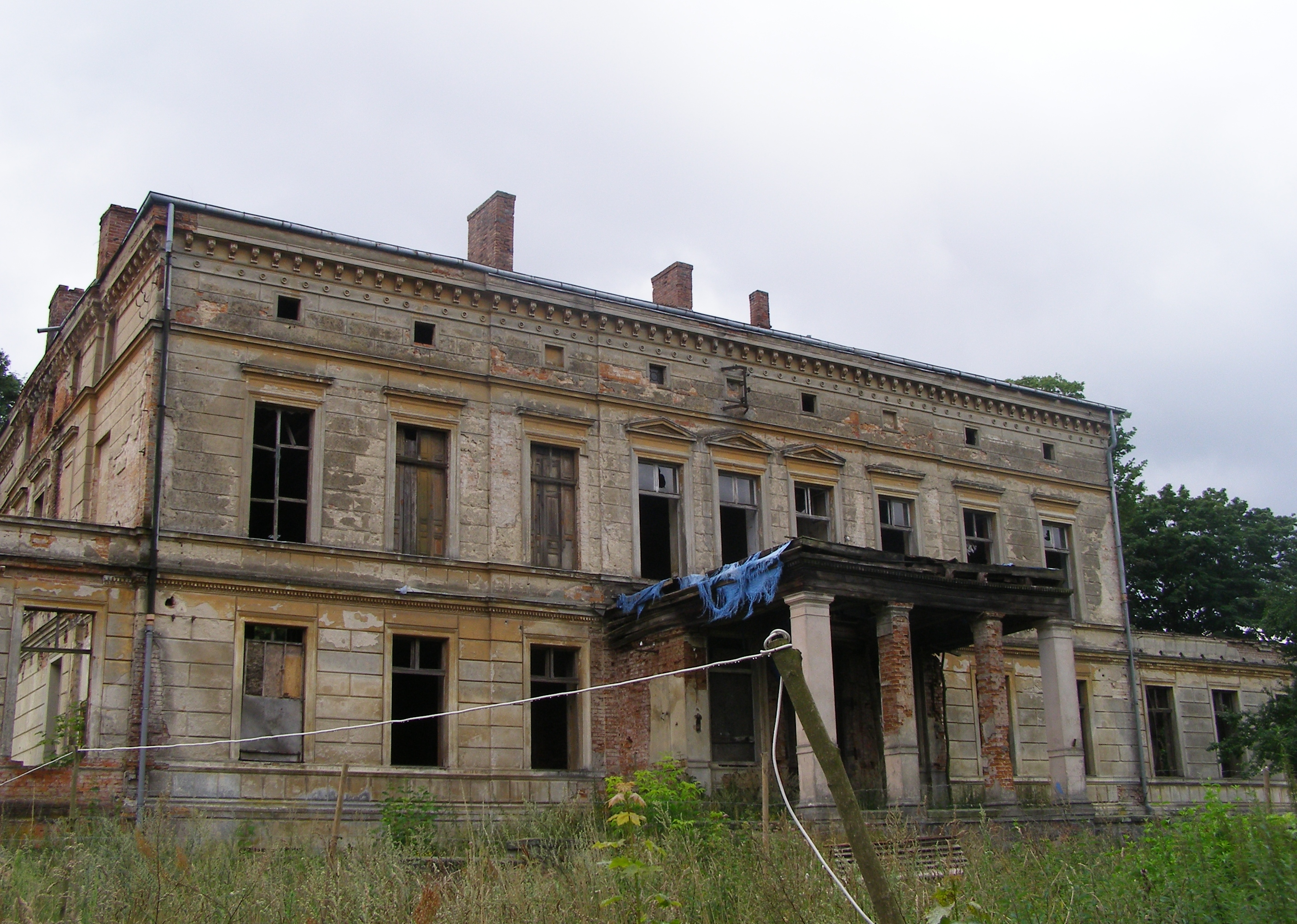
- Osiek Palace, Strzelce-Drezdenko County

- Location within Poland
- Coordinates: 52°58′12″N 15°42′01″E
- Country: Poland
- Voivodeship: Lubusz
- County: Strzelce-Drezdenko
- Gmina: Dobiegniew

Osiek [ˈɔɕɛk] is a village in the administrative district of Gmina Dobiegniew, within Strzelce-Drezdenko County, Lubusz Voivodeship, in western Poland.
