= Rozkochowo =

- Settlement
- Location within Poland
- Coordinates: 52°55′12″N 15°46′12″E
- Country: Poland
- Voivodeship: Lubusz
- County: Strzelce-Drezdenko
- Gmina: Dobiegniew

Rozkochowo [rɔskɔˈxɔvɔ] is a settlement in the administrative district of Gmina Dobiegniew, within Strzelce-Drezdenko County, Lubusz Voivodeship, in western Poland.
