= Rolewice =

- Village
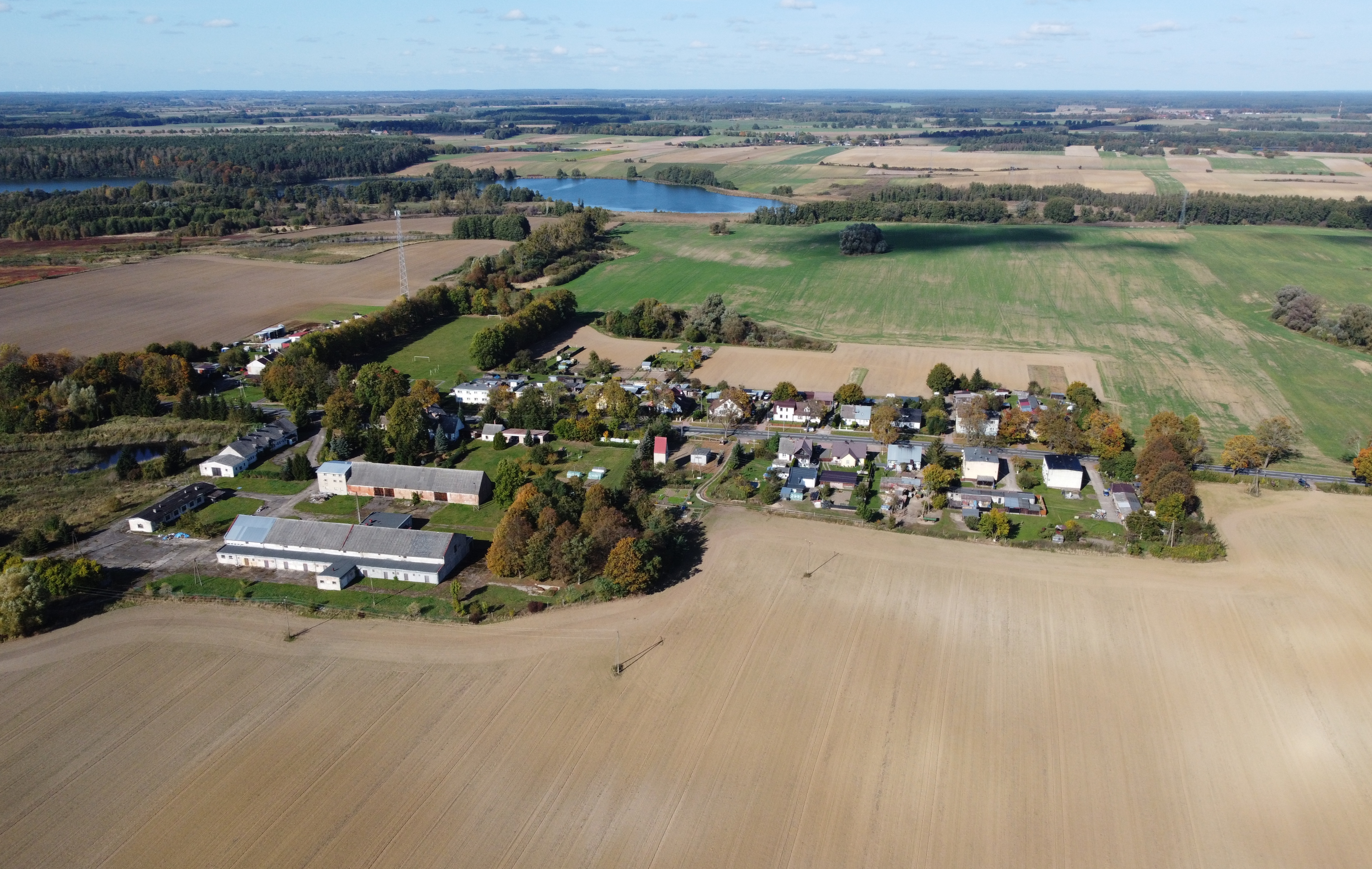

- Location within Poland
- Coordinates: 52°58′40″N 15°48′6″E
- Country: Poland
- Voivodeship: Lubusz
- County: Strzelce-Drezdenko
- Gmina: Dobiegniew
- Population: 190

Rolewice [rɔlɛˈvit͡sɛ] is a village in the administrative district of Gmina Dobiegniew, within Strzelce-Drezdenko County, Lubusz Voivodeship, in western Poland.
