= Wołogoszcz =

Wołogoszcz may refer to:

- Polish name for Wolgast, Germany
- Wołogoszcz, Lubusz Voivodeship, a village in western Poland
