= Chomętowo, Lubusz Voivodeship =

Chomętowo
- Village
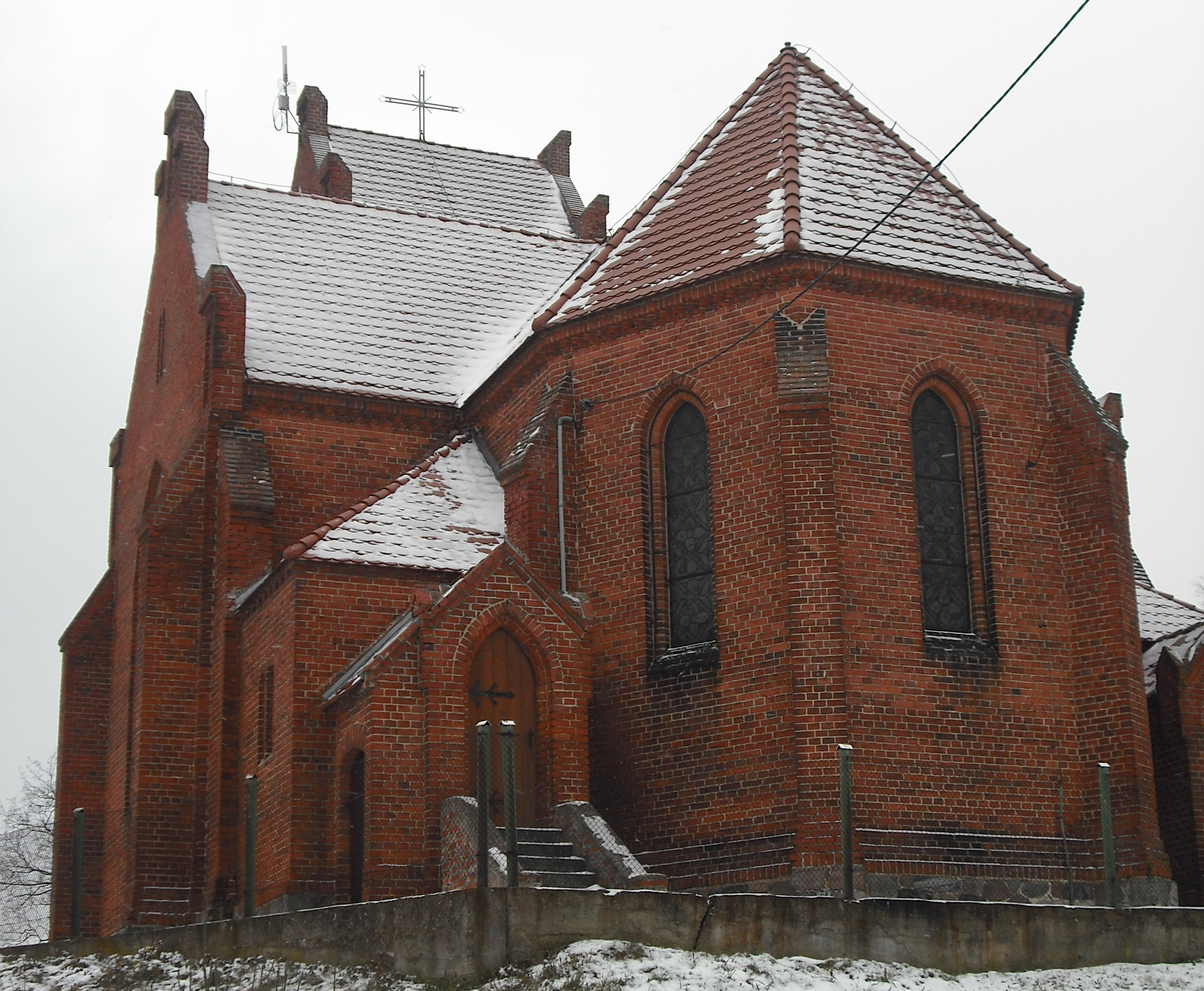
- Church of the Child Jesus in Chomętowo

- Coat of arms

- Location within Poland
- Coordinates: 52°25′8.3″N 15°25′8.3″E
- Country: Poland
- Voivodeship: Lubusz
- County: Strzelce-Drezdenko
- Gmina: Dobiegniew

Chomętowo [xɔmɛnˈtɔvɔ] is a village in the administrative district of Gmina Dobiegniew, within Strzelce-Drezdenko County, Lubusz Voivodeship, in western Poland.
