= Przynotecko =

- Village
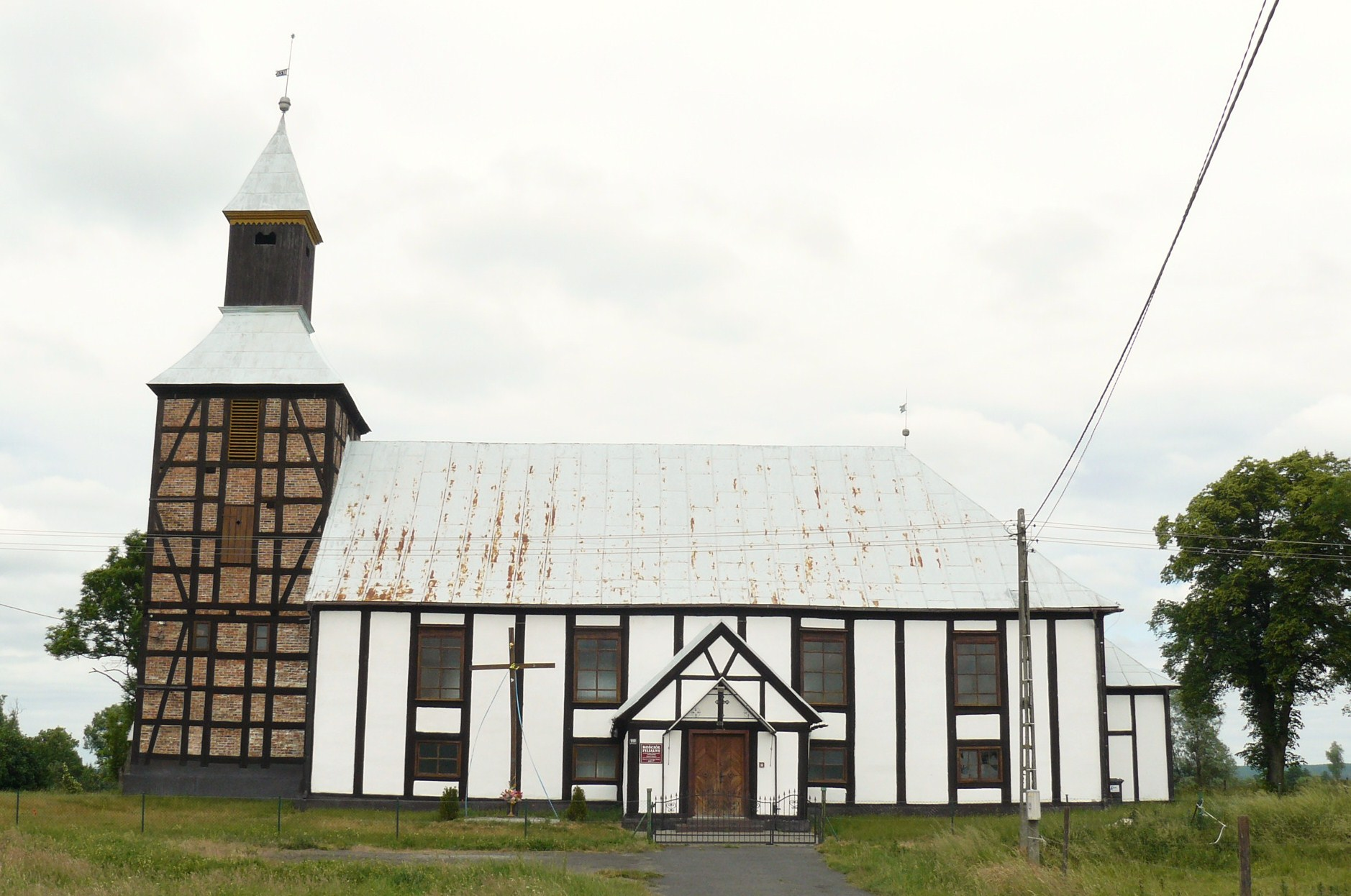
- Catholic church

- Location within Poland
- Coordinates: 52°49′N 15°43′E
- Country: Poland
- Voivodeship: Lubusz
- County: Strzelce-Drezdenko
- Gmina: Stare Kurowo

Przynotecko [pʂɨnɔˈtɛt͡skɔ] is a village in the administrative district of Gmina Stare Kurowo, within Strzelce-Drezdenko County, Lubusz Voivodeship, in western Poland.
