= Podszkle, Lubusz Voivodeship =

Podszkle
- Settlement
- Location within Poland
- Coordinates: 53°2′19″N 15°57′7″E
- Country: Poland
- Voivodeship: Lubusz
- County: Strzelce-Drezdenko
- Gmina: Dobiegniew

Podszkle [ˈpɔtʂklɛ] is a settlement in the administrative district of Gmina Dobiegniew, within Strzelce-Drezdenko County, Lubusz Voivodeship, in western Poland.
