= Mostniki =

- Settlement
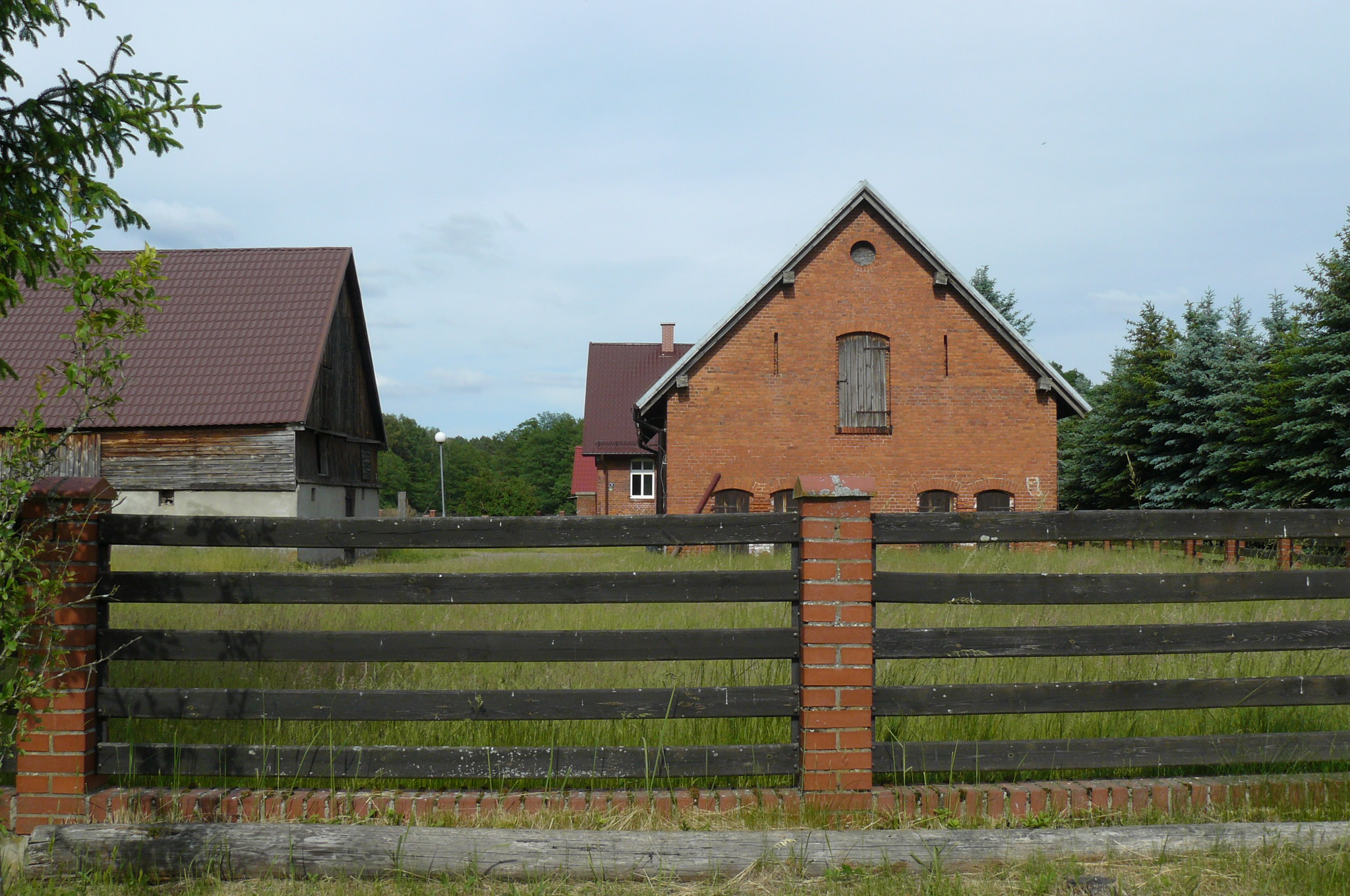

- Location within Poland
- Coordinates: 53°2′3″N 15°57′4″E
- Country: Poland
- Voivodeship: Lubusz
- County: Strzelce-Drezdenko
- Gmina: Dobiegniew

Mostniki [mɔstˈniki] is a settlement in the administrative district of Gmina Dobiegniew, within Strzelce-Drezdenko County, Lubusz Voivodeship, in western Poland.
