= Czarnolesie =

Czarnolesie may refer to the following places:

- Czarnolesie, Lubusz Voivodeship (west Poland)
- Czarnolesie, Pomeranian Voivodeship (north Poland)
- Czarnolesie, West Pomeranian Voivodeship (north-west Poland)
