= Sarbinowo, Lubusz Voivodeship =

Sarbinowo
- Village
- Location within Poland
- Coordinates: 52°56′N 15°52′E
- Country: Poland
- Voivodeship: Lubusz
- County: Strzelce-Drezdenko
- Gmina: Dobiegniew
- Population: 105

Sarbinowo [sarbiˈnɔvɔ] (German: Schüttenburg) is a village in the administrative district of Gmina Dobiegniew, within Strzelce-Drezdenko County, Lubusz Voivodeship, in western Poland.

The village has a population of 105.
