= Słowin =

- Village
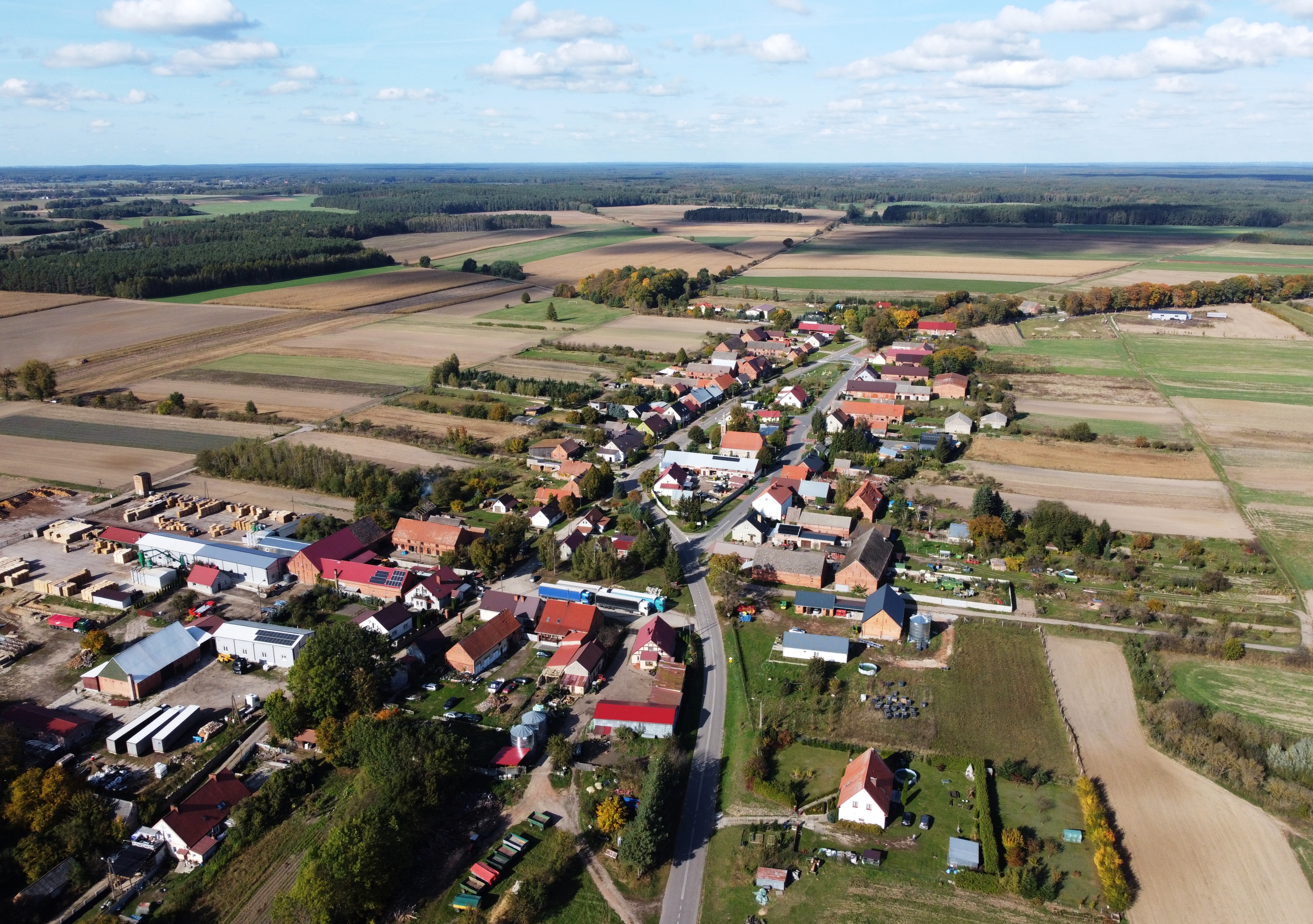

- Location within Poland
- Coordinates: 53°1′N 15°48′E
- Country: Poland
- Voivodeship: Lubusz
- County: Strzelce-Drezdenko
- Gmina: Dobiegniew

Słowin [ˈswɔvin] is a village in the administrative district of Gmina Dobiegniew, within Strzelce-Drezdenko County, Lubusz Voivodeship, in western Poland.
