= Sławica, Lubusz Voivodeship =

Sławica
- Village
- Location within Poland
- Coordinates: 52°55′09″N 15°43′38″E
- Country: Poland
- Voivodeship: Lubusz
- County: Strzelce-Drezdenko
- Gmina: Dobiegniew

Sławica [swaˈvit͡sa] is a village in the administrative district of Gmina Dobiegniew, within Strzelce-Drezdenko County, Lubusz Voivodeship, in western Poland.
