= Pokręt =

- Village
- Location within Poland
- Coordinates: 52°55′11″N 15°50′26″E
- Country: Poland
- Voivodeship: Lubusz
- County: Strzelce-Drezdenko
- Gmina: Dobiegniew
- Population: 100

Pokręt [ˈpɔkrɛnt] is a village in the administrative district of Gmina Dobiegniew, within Strzelce-Drezdenko County, Lubusz Voivodeship, in western Poland.
