= Ostrowiec, Lubusz Voivodeship =

Ostrowiec
- Village
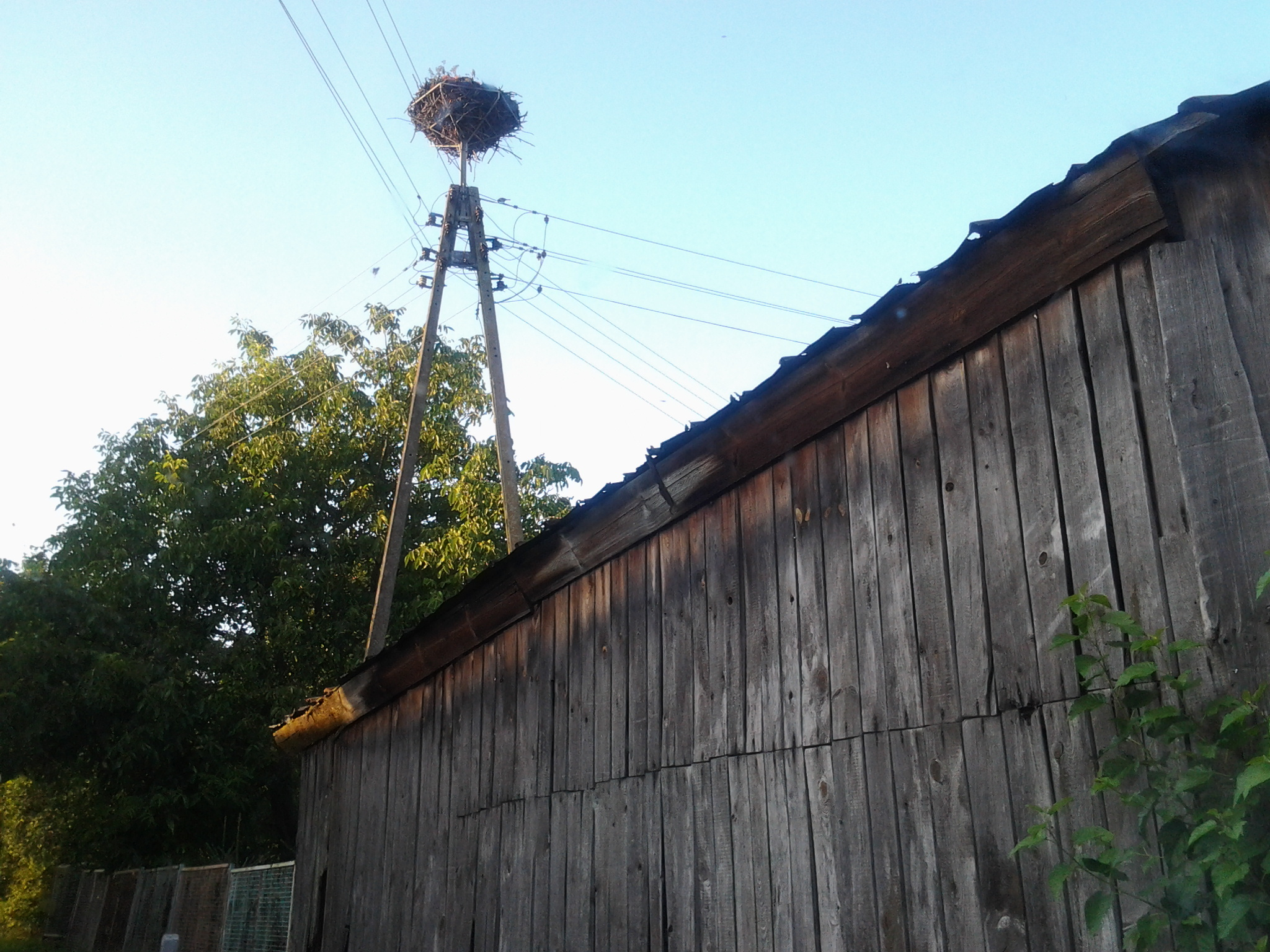

- Location within Poland
- Coordinates: 52°55′46″N 15°45′3″E
- Country: Poland
- Voivodeship: Lubusz
- County: Strzelce-Drezdenko
- Gmina: Dobiegniew
- Population: 130

Ostrowiec [ɔsˈtrɔvjɛt͡s] is a village in the administrative district of Gmina Dobiegniew, within Strzelce-Drezdenko County, Lubusz Voivodeship, in western Poland.
