= Głęboczek, Lubusz Voivodeship =

Głęboczek
- Village
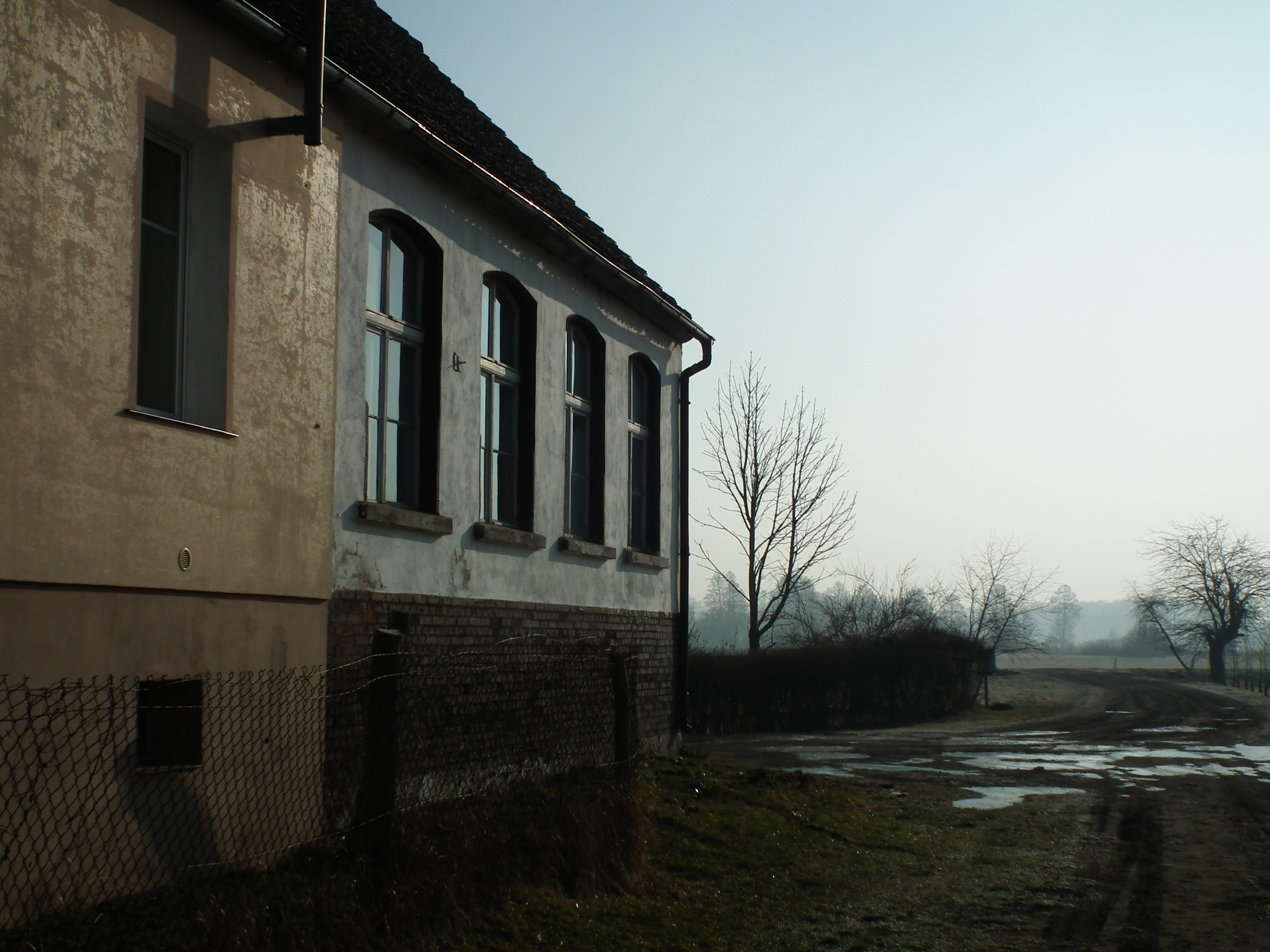
- Old school in Głęboczek on the Noteć river

- Location within Poland
- Coordinates: 52°50′28″N 15°43′59″E
- Country: Poland
- Voivodeship: Lubusz
- County: Strzelce-Drezdenko
- Gmina: Stare Kurowo

Głęboczek [ɡwɛmˈbɔt͡ʂɛk] is a village in the administrative district of Gmina Stare Kurowo, within Strzelce-Drezdenko County, Lubusz Voivodeship, in western Poland.
