= Osieczek, Lubusz Voivodeship =

Osieczek
- Settlement
- Location within Poland
- Coordinates: 52°58′42″N 15°41′28″E
- Country: Poland
- Voivodeship: Lubusz
- County: Strzelce-Drezdenko
- Gmina: Dobiegniew

Osieczek [ɔˈɕɛt͡ʂɛk] is a settlement in the administrative district of Gmina Dobiegniew, within Strzelce-Drezdenko County, Lubusz Voivodeship, in western Poland.
