= Świnki, Lubusz Voivodeship =

Świnki
- Settlement
- Location within Poland
- Coordinates: 53°4′17″N 15°51′17″E
- Country: Poland
- Voivodeship: Lubusz
- County: Strzelce-Drezdenko
- Gmina: Dobiegniew

Świnki [ˈɕfinki] is a settlement in the administrative district of Gmina Dobiegniew, within Strzelce-Drezdenko County, Lubusz Voivodeship, in western Poland.
