= Suchów =

- Settlement
- Location within Poland
- Coordinates: 53°2′37″N 15°53′16″E
- Country: Poland
- Voivodeship: Lubusz
- County: Strzelce-Drezdenko
- Gmina: Dobiegniew

Suchów [ˈsuxuf] is a settlement in the administrative district of Gmina Dobiegniew, within Strzelce-Drezdenko County, Lubusz Voivodeship, in western Poland.
