= Suzhou (disambiguation) =

Suzhou, Jiangsu (江苏苏州), is a prefecture-level city of Jiangsu Province, China.

Suzhou may also refer to:

- Suzhou, Anhui (安徽宿州), a prefecture-level city of Anhui Province.
- Suzhou District (肃州区), a district of Jiuquan City, Gansu Province.
- Suzhou Creek (苏州河), a tributary of Huangpu River passing through Shanghai, with its principal outlet in Suzhou, Jiangsu

== Other uses ==
- Suzhou River (film), a film by Lou Ye
- 2719 Suzhou, an asteroid named after Suzhou, Jiangsu
- Suzhou dialect
- Suzhou embroidery
- Suzhou numerals

== See also ==
- Xuzhou (disambiguation)
- Suchow (disambiguation)
