= Gmina Dobiegniew =

Gmina Dobiegniew Dobiegniew Commune
- Gmina
- Coat of arms
- Interactive map of Gmina Dobiegniew
- Coordinates (Dobiegniew): 52°58′N 15°45′E
- Country: Poland
- Voivodeship: Lubusz
- County: Strzelce-Drezdenko
- Seat: Dobiegniew

Area
  - Total: 350.99 km^{2} (135.52 sq mi)

Population (2019-06-30)
  - Total: 6,544
  - Density: 18.64/km^{2} (48.29/sq mi)
  - Urban: 3,061
  - Rural: 3,483
- Website: http://www.dobiegniew.pl/

Gmina Dobiegniew is an urban-rural gmina (administrative district) in Strzelce-Drezdenko County, Lubusz Voivodeship, in western Poland. Its seat is the town of Dobiegniew, which lies approximately 18 kilometres (11 mi) north-east of Strzelce Krajeńskie and 43 km (27 mi) north-east of Gorzów Wielkopolski.

The gmina covers an area of 350.99 square kilometres (135.5 sq mi), and as of 2019 its total population is 6,544.

== Villages ==
Apart from the town of Dobiegniew, Gmina Dobiegniew contains the villages and settlements of Chomętowo, Chrapów, Czarnolesie, Dębnik, Dębogóra, Derkacze, Głusko, Grabionka, Grąsy, Grzmikoło, Jarychowo, Kamienna Knieja, Kępa Zagajna, Kowalec, Kubczyce, Łęczyn, Lipinka, Lubiewko, Ługi, Ługowo, Mierzęcin, Młodolino, Moczele, Mostniki, Niemiennica, Niwy, Nowy Młyn, Osieczek, Osiek, Osowiec, Ostrowiec, Ostrowiec-Osada, Ostrowite, Podlesiec, Podszkle, Pokręt, Radachowo, Radęcin, Rolewice, Rozkochowo, Sarbinowo, Sitnica, Sławica, Słonów, Słowin, Starczewo, Stare Osieczno, Suchów, Świnki, Urszulanka, Wilczy Dół, Wołogoszcz and Żeleźnica.

== Neighbouring gminas ==
Gmina Dobiegniew is bordered by the gminas of Bierzwnik, Człopa, Drawno, Drezdenko, Krzyż Wielkopolski, Stare Kurowo and Strzelce Krajeńskie.

== Twin towns – sister cities ==
Gmina Dobiegniew is twinned with:

- Amt Golzow, Germany
