= Kowalec =

- Settlement
- Location within Poland
- Coordinates: 53°02′35″N 15°51′05″E
- Country: Poland
- Voivodeship: Lubusz
- County: Strzelce-Drezdenko
- Gmina: Dobiegniew

Kowalec [kɔˈvalɛt͡s] is a settlement in the administrative district of Gmina Dobiegniew, within Strzelce-Drezdenko County, Lubusz Voivodeship, in western Poland.
