= Dębnik, Lubusz Voivodeship =

Dębnik
- Settlement
- Location within Poland
- Coordinates: 52°55′33″N 15°52′40″E
- Country: Poland
- Voivodeship: Lubusz
- County: Strzelce-Drezdenko
- Gmina: Dobiegniew

Dębnik [ˈdɛmbnik] is a settlement in the administrative district of Gmina Dobiegniew, within Strzelce-Drezdenko County, Lubusz Voivodeship, in western Poland.
