= Dobiegniew railway station =

Railway station in Dobiegniew, Poland

Coordinates: 52.9684°N 15.7473°E

Dobiegniew
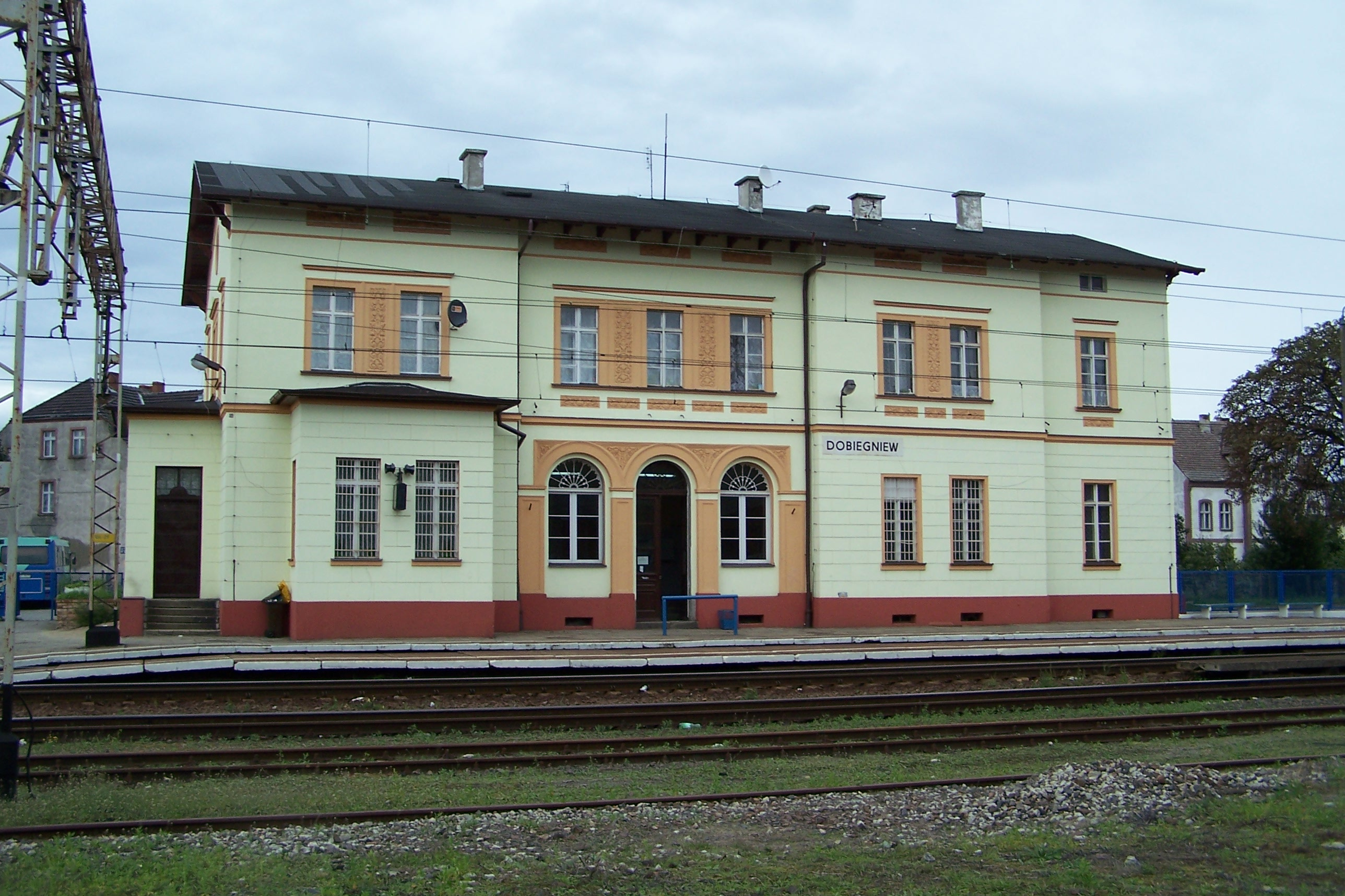
- Dobiegniew railway station

General information
- Location: Dobiegniew, Lubusz Voivodeship; Poland
- System: Railway Station
- Operator: PKP; Polregio
- Line: 351: Poznań–Szczecin railway
- Platforms: 3
- Tracks: 5

History
- Opened: June 1848; 178 years ago
Location
- Location within Poland

Dobiegniew railway station is a railway station serving the town of Dobiegniew, in the Lubusz Voivodeship, Poland. The station opened in June 1848 and is located on the Poznań–Szczecin railway. The train services are operated by PKP and Polregio.

The station used to be known as Woldenberg between 1848 and 1909, and Woldenberg (Neumark) from 1910 until 1945.

== Train services ==
The station is served by the following services:

- Intercity services Swinoujscie - Szczecin - Stargard - Krzyz - Poznan - Kutno - Warsaw - Bialystok / Lublin - Rzeszow - Przemysl
- Intercity services Swinoujscie - Szczecin - Stargard - Krzyz - Poznan - Leszno - Wroclaw - Opole - Katowice - Krakow - Rzeszow - Przemysl
- Intercity services Szczecin - Stargard - Krzyz - Poznan - Kutno - Lowicz - Lodz - Krakow
- Intercity services Szczecin - Stargard - Krzyz - Pila - Bydgoszcz - Torun - Kutno - Lowicz - Warsaw - Lublin - Rzeszow - Przemysl
- Regional services (R) Swinoujscie - Szczecin - Stargard - Dobiegniew - Krzyz - Szamotuly - Poznan

Preceding station	Polregio	Following station
Bierzwnik towards Świnoujście	PR	Mierzęcin Strzelecki towards Poznań Główny
