= Stare Kurowo =

- Village
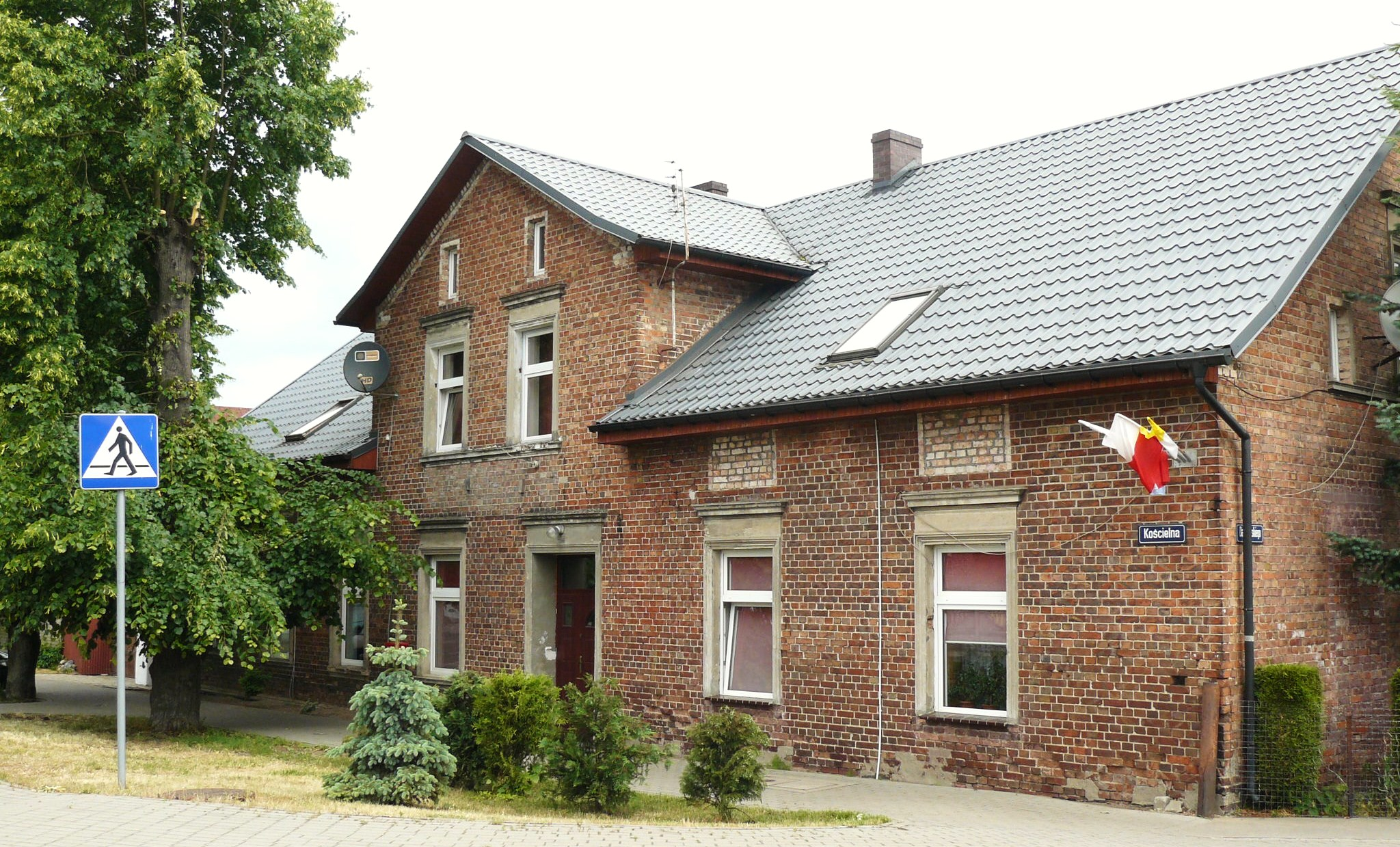

- Location within Poland
- Coordinates: 52°51′N 15°39′E
- Country: Poland
- Voivodeship: Lubusz
- County: Strzelce-Drezdenko
- Gmina: Stare Kurowo
- First mentioned: 1317

Population
  - Total: 2,100
- Time zone: UTC+1 (CET)
  - Summer (DST): UTC+2 (CEST)
- Vehicle registration: FSD

Stare Kurowo [ˈstarɛ kuˈrɔvɔ] (German: Altkarbe) is a village in Strzelce-Drezdenko County, Lubusz Voivodeship, in western Poland. It is the seat of the gmina (administrative district) called Gmina Stare Kurowo.

Two Polish citizens were murdered by Nazi Germany in the village during World War II.
