= Gmina Stare Kurowo =

Gmina Stare Kurowo Stare Kurowo Commune
- Gmina
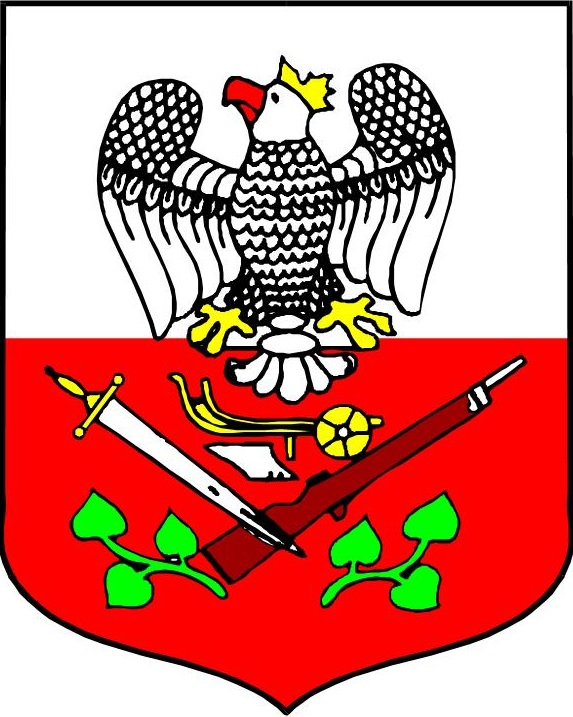
- Coat of arms
- Interactive map of Gmina Stare Kurowo
- Coordinates (Stare Kurowo): 52°51′N 15°39′E
- Country: Poland
- Voivodeship: Lubusz
- County: Strzelce-Drezdenko
- Seat: Stare Kurowo

Area
  - Total: 77.88 km^{2} (30.07 sq mi)

Population (2019-06-30)
  - Total: 4,059
  - Density: 52.12/km^{2} (135.0/sq mi)
- Website: http://www.starekurowo.pl

Gmina Stare Kurowo is a rural gmina (administrative district) in Strzelce-Drezdenko County, Lubusz Voivodeship, in western Poland. Its seat is the village of Stare Kurowo, which lies approximately 9 kilometres (6 mi) east of Strzelce Krajeńskie and 30 km (19 mi) north-east of Gorzów Wielkopolski.

The gmina covers an area of 77.88 square kilometres (30.1 sq mi), and as of 2019 its total population was 4,059.

== Villages ==
Gmina Stare Kurowo contains the villages and settlements of Błotnica, Głęboczek, Kawki, Łącznica, Łęgowo, Nowe Kurowo, Pławin, Przynotecko, Rokitno, Smolarz and Stare Kurowo.

== Neighbouring gminas ==
Gmina Stare Kurowo is bordered by the gminas of Dobiegniew, Drezdenko, Strzelce Krajeńskie and Zwierzyn.
