= Wołogoszcz, Lubusz Voivodeship =

Wołogoszcz
- Village
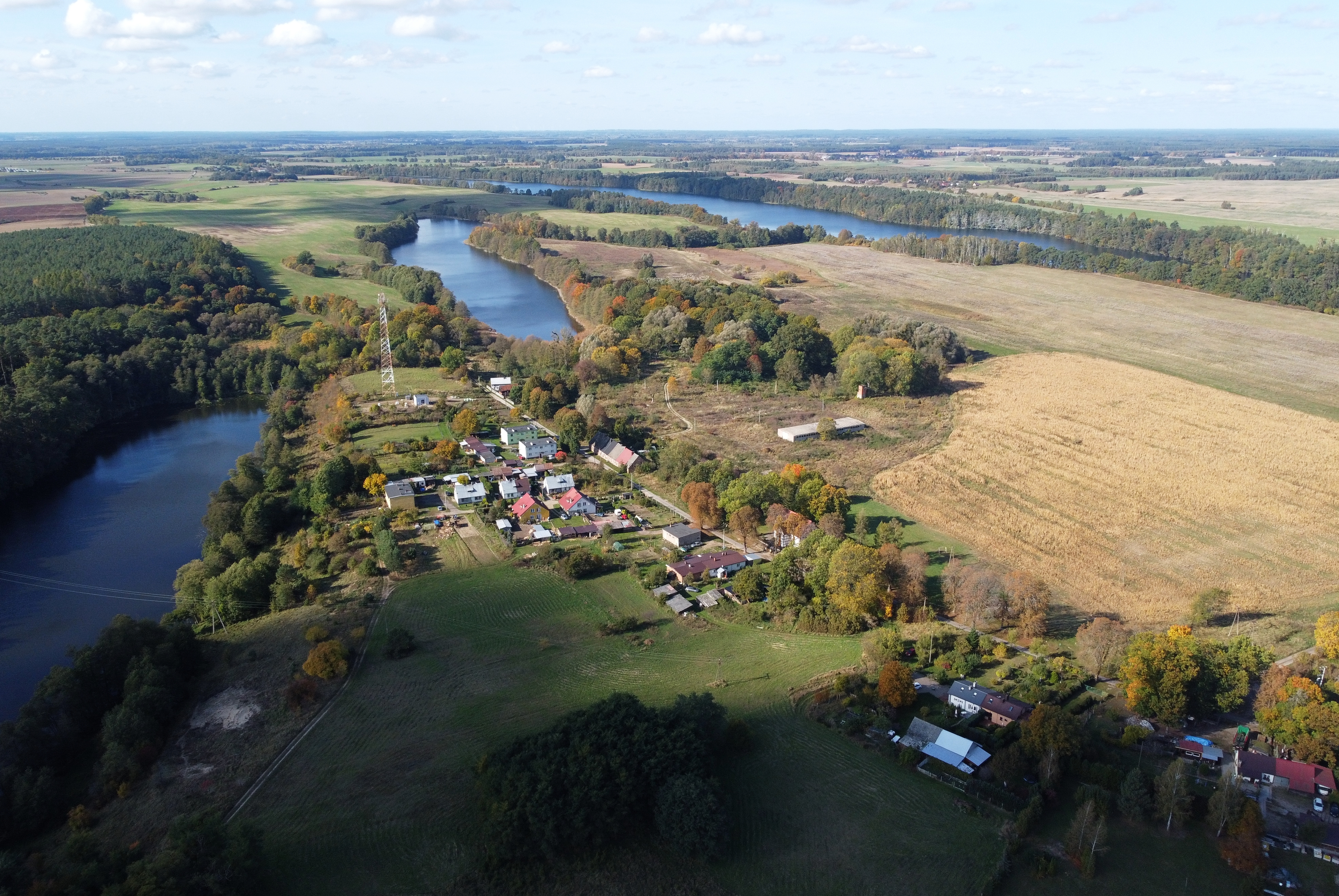

- Location within Poland
- Coordinates: 52°59′30″N 15°50′32″E
- Country: Poland
- Voivodeship: Lubusz
- County: Strzelce-Drezdenko
- Gmina: Dobiegniew
- Population: 170

Wołogoszcz [vɔˈwɔɡɔʂt͡ʂ] is a village in the administrative district of Gmina Dobiegniew, within Strzelce-Drezdenko County, Lubusz Voivodeship, in western Poland.
