= Czarnolesie, Lubusz Voivodeship =

Czarnolesie
- Settlement
- Location within Poland
- Coordinates: 52°58′48″N 15°57′0″E
- Country: Poland
- Voivodeship: Lubusz
- County: Strzelce-Drezdenko
- Gmina: Dobiegniew

Czarnolesie [t͡ʂarnɔˈlɛɕɛ] is a settlement in the administrative district of Gmina Dobiegniew, within Strzelce-Drezdenko County, Lubusz Voivodeship, in western Poland.
