= Lipinka, Lubusz Voivodeship =

Lipinka
- Village
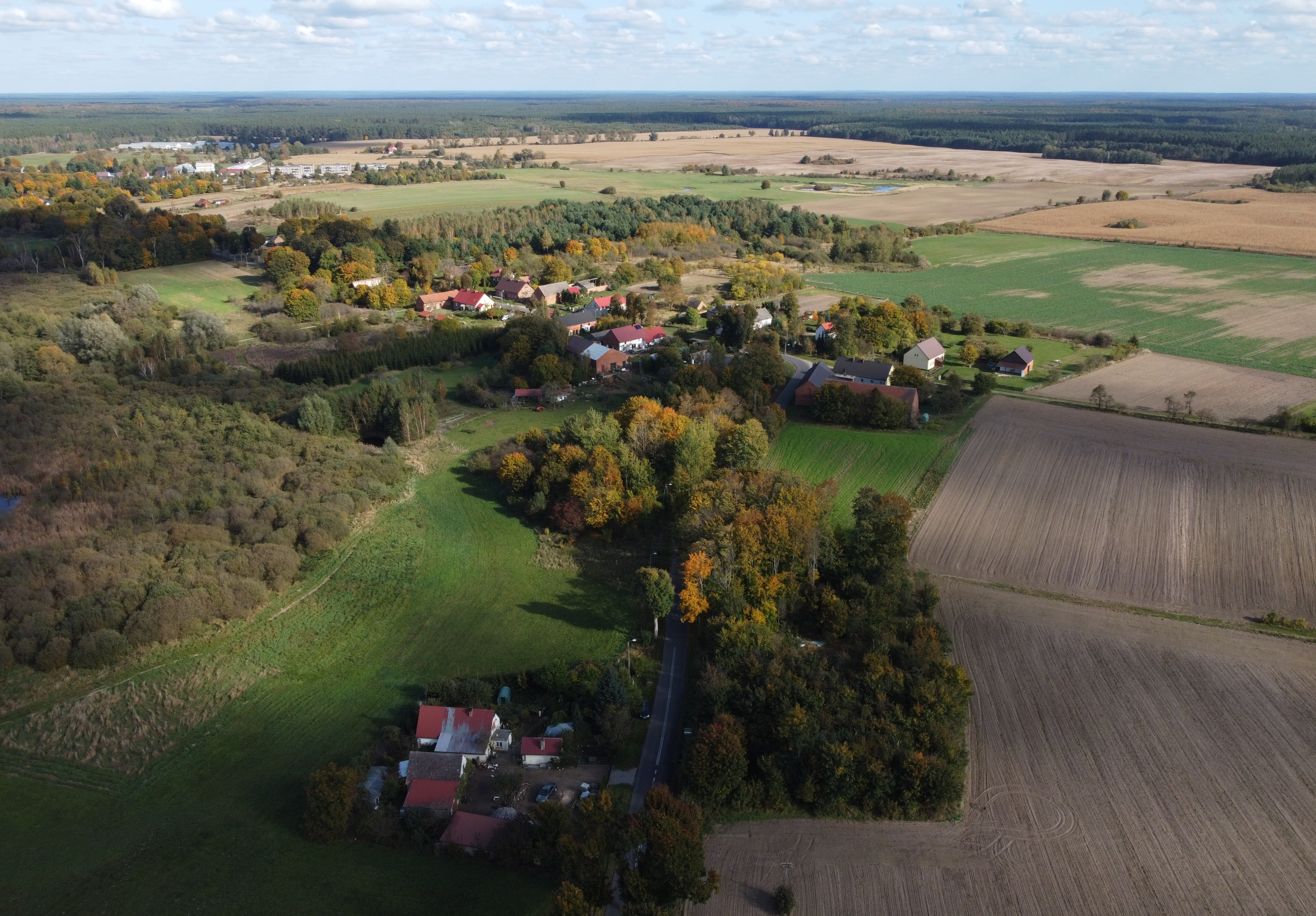

- Location within Poland
- Coordinates: 53°02′07″N 15°50′31″E
- Country: Poland
- Voivodeship: Lubusz
- County: Strzelce-Drezdenko
- Gmina: Dobiegniew

Lipinka [liˈpiŋka] is a village in the administrative district of Gmina Dobiegniew, within Strzelce-Drezdenko County, Lubusz Voivodeship, in western Poland.
