= Dobiegniew =

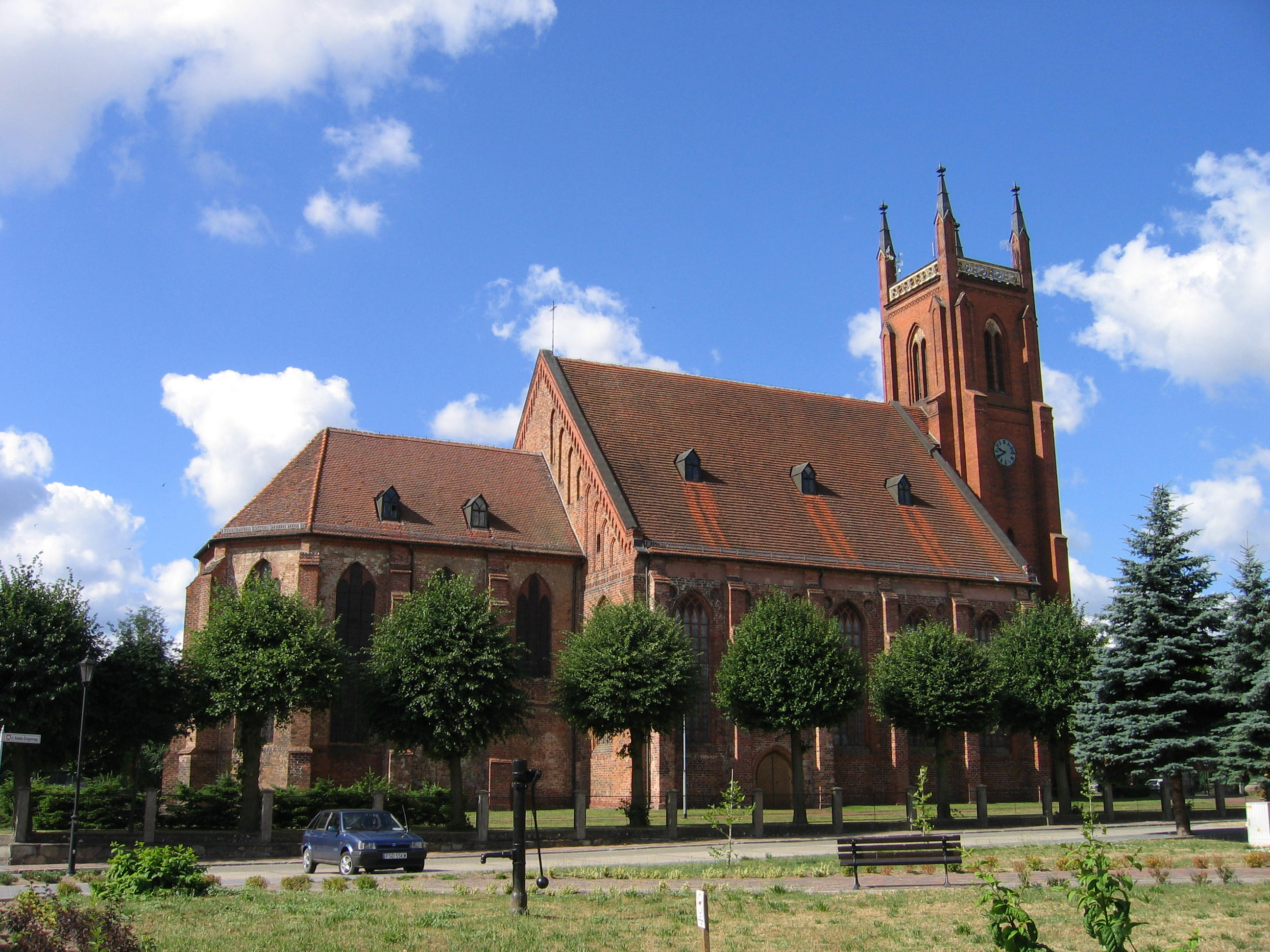
- Christ the King church in Dobiegniew

- Coat of arms

- Location within Poland
- Coordinates: 52°58′N 15°45′E
- Country: Poland
- Voivodeship: Lubusz
- County: Strzelce-Drezdenko
- Gmina: Dobiegniew
- First mentioned: 1250
- Town rights: 1298

Area
  - Total: 5.69 km^{2} (2.20 sq mi)

Population (31 December 2021)
  - Total: 3,004
  - Density: 528/km^{2} (1,370/sq mi)
- Time zone: UTC+1 (CET)
  - Summer (DST): UTC+2 (CEST)
- Postal code: 66-520
- Area code: +48 95
- Vehicle registration: FSD
- Website: http://www.dobiegniew.pl

Dobiegniew [dɔˈbʲɛɡɲɛf] (German: Woldenberg) is a town in western Poland, in Lubusz Voivodeship, in Strzelce-Drezdenko County. As of December 2021, the town has 3,004 inhabitants. It is situated on the Mierzęcka Struga River and southern shore of Wielgie Lake.

== History ==
The area formed part of Greater Poland in Piast-ruled Poland. The settlement was mentioned in 1250, when Duke Przemysł I of Greater Poland granted it to Cistercians from Owińska. In 1280 it was mentioned under the Latinized name villa Dobegneve in a document of Przemysł II of Poland. It was granted town rights in 1298.

In 1333 the town's name is mentioned as Waldinborg. In 1373, along with the region it became part of the Czech Crown Lands, ruled by the Luxembourg dynasty. In 1402, the Luxembourgs reached an agreement with Poland in Kraków, according to which Poland was to purchase and re-incorporate the region, but eventually the Luxembourgs sold it to the Teutonic Order. It was captured by joint Polish-Czech forces in 1433, during the Polish–Teutonic War (1431–1435). When another Polish-Teutonic war broke out in 1454, the Teutonic Knights sold the region to the Margraviate of Brandenburg in order to raise funds for war. The prosperity of the town came from agriculture, clothmaking and trade. It was located on the trade route connecting Poznań and Szczecin, and despite its annexation from Poland, it still had strong ties with Greater Poland. After the Thirty Years' War (1618–1648) many Poles settled in the town, and until 1660 local merchants were exempt from tariffs in trade with Poland. From the 18th century it was part of the Kingdom of Prussia and from 1871 also Germany, until 1945.

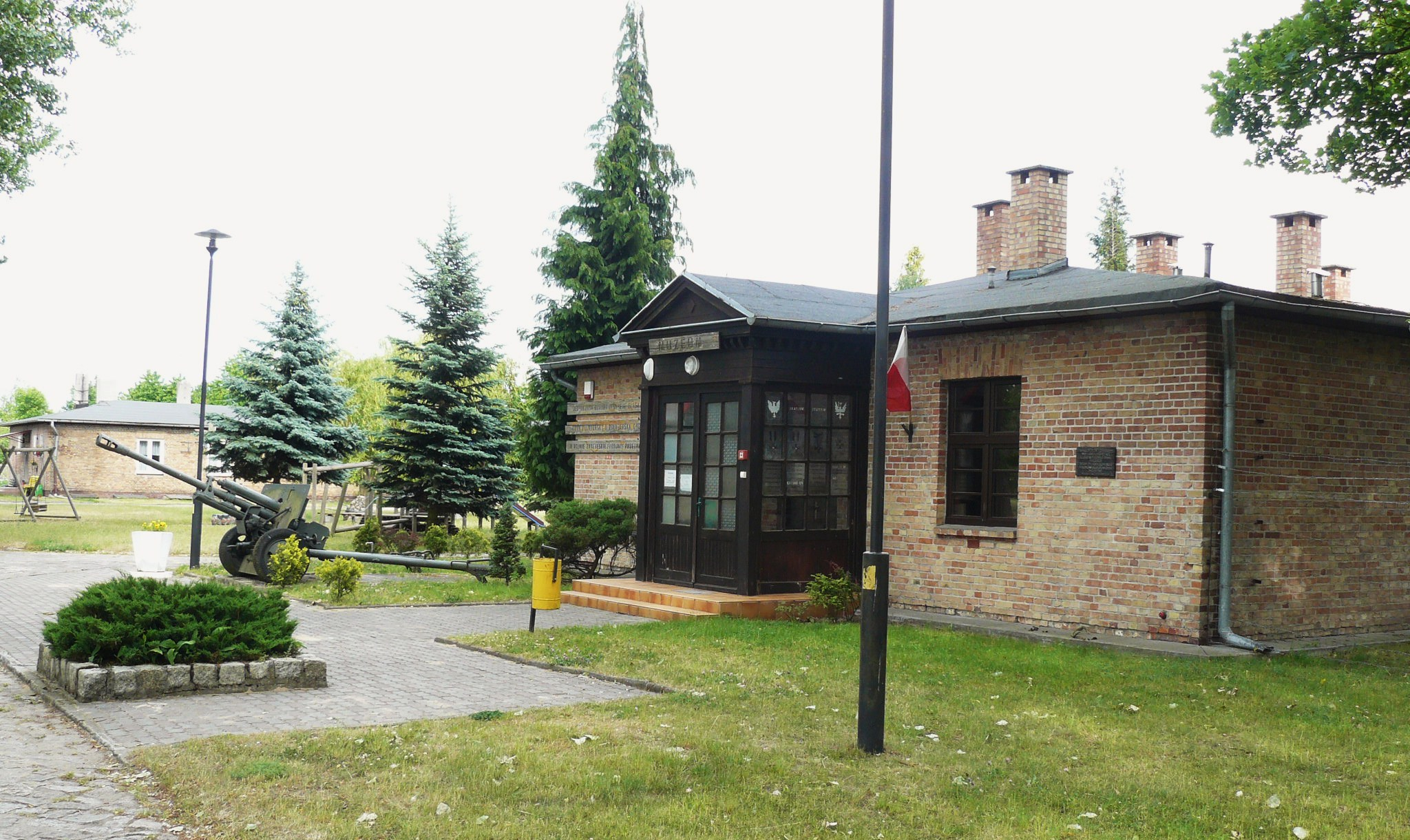
Former Oflag II-C German POW camp, now a museum

During World War II, in September 1939, the Stalag II-C German prisoner-of-war camp for some 15,000 Polish prisoners of war was established nearby (today within the town limits) with multiple forced labor detachments in the region. In May 1940 it was relocated to Greifswald, and the Oflag II-C camp was established for Polish officers. Today it houses the Muzeum Woldenberczyków, which is dedicated to the history of the prisoners. A forced labour subcamp of the Stalag II-D POW camp was located in the town. Poles and French POWs were subjected to forced labor in the town, with two Poles publicly executed by the Gestapo in April 1941 for talking to the French. The Germans also established a prison for foreigners, mostly Poles, accused of wanting to escape from forced labor. In the final stages of World War II, the town was heavily destroyed and finally captured in January 1945. Subsequently, the town became again part of Poland and its historic name Dobiegniew was restored.

== Transport ==
Dobiegniew is located at the intersection of National road 22 and Voivodeship road 160, and there is also a railway station.

== Culture ==
The main cultural institution of the town is the Culture Center (Centrum Kultury w Dobiegniewie) with its public library and there is also a museum at the former Oflag II-C POW camp, dedicated to the Polish officers held there during World War II.

== Demographics ==
Historical population

Year	Pop.	±%
1843	3,379	—
1871	3,916	+15.9%
1880	4,354	+11.2%
1890	4,676	+7.4%
1900	4,477	−4.3%
1910	4,608	+2.9%

Year	Pop.	±%
1925	4,787	+3.9%
1939	5,334	+11.4%
1950	1,776	−66.7%
1960	2,869	+61.5%
2010	3,169	+10.5%

== Education ==
Dobiegniew has an elementary school, a general education liceum and a vocational high school.

== Twin towns – sister cities ==
See twin towns of Gmina Dobiegniew.
