= Friedrich Wilhelm Semmler =

German chemist (1860–1931)

- Born: 11 May 1860; Hochzeit, Kreis Arnswalde, Province of Brandenburg
- Died: 15 March 1931 (aged 70); Ramin, Germany
- Education: University of Straßburg, University of Breslau.
- Known for: Research into terpenes
- Scientific career
- Fields: Chemistry
- Workplaces: University of Breslau

Friedrich Wilhelm Semmler (11 May 1860 in Hochzeit, Province of Brandenburg – 15 March 1931) was a German chemist.

== Life ==
Semmler studied chemistry at the University of Straßburg and at the University of Breslau. He received is PhD in Breslau in 1887 and his habilitation at the University of Greifswald in 1890. From 1896 till 1907 Semmler was professor at the University of Greifswald. After a two-year time working with Hermann Emil Fischer in Berlin Semmler accepted a position at the University of Breslau.

After World War I Semmler increased his involvement into politics and he was elected in January 1919 for the German National People's Party as member of the Weimar National Assembly. Subsequently, he was also elected for the German Parliament for the period between 1920 and 1924. From 1925 until his death in 1931 he was member of the Preußischer Landtag.

During his academic career he focused on the research on terpenes. He was also able to determine the structure of various terpenes and of the main compound of garlic oil, diallyl disulfide.

== Works ==
- Die ätherischen Öle nach ihren chemischen Bestandteilen : unter Berücksichtigung der geschichtlichen Entwicklung . Vol. 1-4 . Veit, Leipzig 1906-1907 Digital edition by the University and State Library Düsseldorf
