= Suzhou, Jiuquan =

Suzhou 肃州区
- District
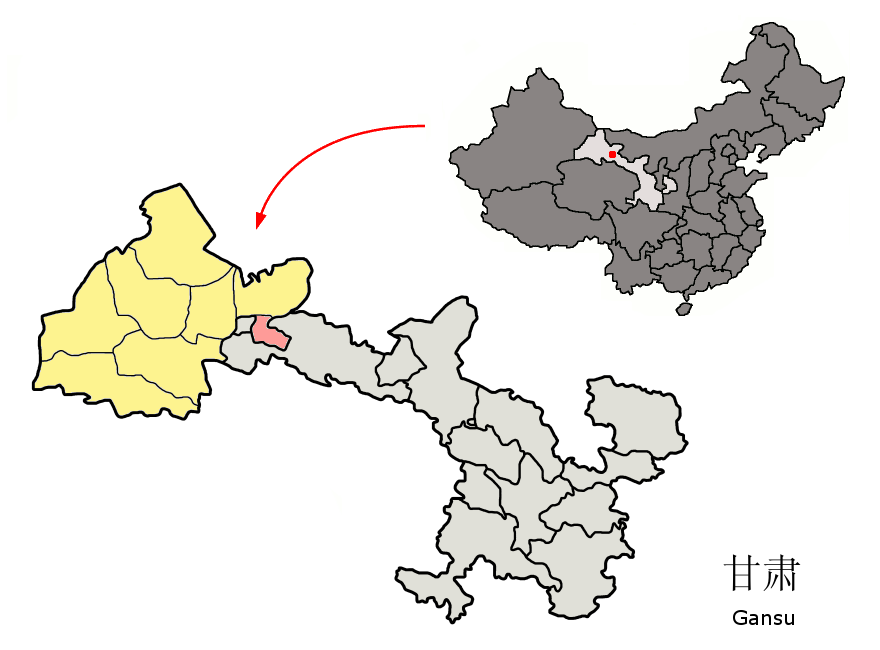
- Suzhou District (red) within Jiuquan City (yellow) and Gansu

- Location in Gansu
- Coordinates: 39°44′28″N 98°30′12″E
- Country: China
- Province: Gansu
- Prefecture-level city: Jiuquan
- District seat: Xibeijie Subdistrict

Area
  - Total: 3,353.74 km^{2} (1,294.89 sq mi)

Population (2020)
  - Total: 455,611
  - Density: 135.852/km^{2} (351.854/sq mi)
- Time zone: UTC+8 (China Standard)
- Postal code: 735000
- Website: www.jqsz.gov.cn

Suzhou, Jiuquan
- Simplified Chinese: 肃州区
- Traditional Chinese: 肅州區
- Literal meaning: Suzhou district
Transcriptions
Standard Mandarin
- Hanyu Pinyin: Sùzhōu Qū
- Wade–Giles: Su-chou Chʻü

Jiuquan
- Chinese: 酒泉
- Literal meaning: Alcohol Spring(s)
Transcriptions
Standard Mandarin
- Wade–Giles: Chiu-chüan

Former names

Fulu
- Traditional Chinese: 福祿
- Simplified Chinese: 福禄
- Literal meaning: Fortunate & Lucky
Transcriptions
Standard Mandarin
- Hanyu Pinyin: Fúlù
- Wade–Giles: Fu-lu

Suzhou
- Traditional Chinese: 肅州
- Simplified Chinese: 肃州
- Literal meaning: Solemn Prefectural [Capital]
Transcriptions
Standard Mandarin
- Hanyu Pinyin: Sùzhōu
- Wade–Giles: Su-chou

Suzhou District is a district of the city of Jiuquan, Gansu Province in the People's Republic of China. It was an important city in its own right. Today, it is the seat of Jiuquan's administration.

== Name ==
Suzhou is named for the former Su Prefecture of imperial China.

== History ==
Su Prefecture was established under the Sui and renamed Jiuquan Commandery under the Tang. Its seat was established just within the extreme northwest angle of the Great Wall near the Jade Gate. It sometimes served as the capital of the province of Gansu. Along with its role protecting trade along the Silk Road, Suzhou was the great center of the rhubarb trade. The old town was completely destroyed in the First Dungan Revolt but was recovered by the Qing in 1873 and was swiftly rebuilt.

== Administrative divisions ==
Suzhou District is divided to 7 Subdistricts, 14 towns, 1 townships and 3 other.

Subdistricts

- Dongbeijie Subdistrict (东北街街道)
- Dongnanjie Subdistrict (东南街街道)
- Gongyeyuan Subdistrict (工业园街道)
- Xincheng Subdistrict (新城街道)
- Xibeijie Subdistrict (西北街街道)
- Xi'nanjie Subdistrict (西南街街道)
- Yuguanjushenghuojidi Subdistrict (玉管局生活基地街道)

Towns

- Xidong (西洞镇)
- Qingshui (清水镇)
- Zongzhai (总寨镇)
- Jinfosi (金佛寺镇)
- Shangba (上坝镇)
- Sandun (三墩镇)
- Yinda (银达镇)
- Xifeng (西峰镇)
- Quanhu (泉湖镇)
- Guoyuan (果园镇)
- Xiaheqing (下河清镇)
- Huajian (铧尖镇)
- Dongdong (东洞镇)
- Fengle (丰乐镇)

Townships

- Huangnipu Township (黄泥堡乡)

Others

- State-owned Xiaheqing Farm (国营下河清农场)
- Jiuquan Economic and Technological Development Zone (酒泉经济技术开发区)
- Base 10 (十号基地)

== See also ==
- Other Suzhous
- List of administrative divisions of Gansu
- Jiuquan, for more history details.
