= Xuzhou, Zitong County =

Xuzhou 许州镇
- Town
- Location in Sichuan
- Coordinates: 31.7777°N 105.1513°E
- Country: People's Republic of China
- Province: Sichuan
- Prefecture-level city: Mianyang
- County: Zitong County
- Time zone: UTC+8 (China Standard)

Xuzhou (Chinese: 许州; pinyin: Xǔzhōu) is a town under the administration of Zitong County, Sichuan, China. As of 2020, it administers the following two residential neighborhoods and 19 villages:

- Hongjunqiao Community (红军桥社区)
- Xianfeng Community (仙峰社区)
- Baiqing Village (百顷村)
- Liaoyuan Village (燎原村)
- Pingyuan Village (平原村)
- Lianmeng Village (联盟村)
- Zhongba Village (中坝村)
- Niutishan Village (牛蹄山村)
- Tianbao Village (天宝村)
- Huanlong Village (豢龙村)
- Tongling Village (铜铃村)
- Zaoya Village (枣垭村)
- Yonggui Village (永桂村)
- Ganzi Village (甘滋村)
- Yumen Village (雨门村)
- Shuanglong Village (双龙村)
- Baiya Village (柏垭村)
- Xiaoya Village (小垭村)
- Shanquan Village (山泉村)
- Jintian Village (金天村)
- Junmin Village (军民村)
