= Ługowo, Zielona Góra County =

Ługowo
- District of Zielona Góra
- Location within Poland Location within Lubusz Voivodeship
- Coordinates: 51°54′N 15°37′E
- Country: Poland
- Voivodeship: Lubusz
- County/City: Zielona Góra
- Population: 90
- Time zone: UTC+1 (CET)
  - Summer (DST): UTC+2 (CEST)
- Area code: +48 68
- Vehicle registration: FZ

Ługowo [wuˈɡɔvɔ] (German: Wilhelminenthal) is a district of the city of Zielona Góra, in western Poland, located in the southeastern part of the city. It was a separate village until 2014.

== Demographics ==
Ługowo has a population of 90.
