= Strzelce–Drezdenko County =

Strzelce–Drezdenko County Powiat strzelecko-drezdenecki
- County
- Flag Coat of arms

- Location within the voivodeship
- Coordinates (Strzelce Krajeńskie): 52°52′32″N 15°31′55″E
- Country: Poland
- Voivodeship: Lubusz
- Seat: Strzelce Krajeńskie
- Gminas: Total 5: Gmina Dobiegniew; Gmina Drezdenko; Gmina Stare Kurowo; Gmina Strzelce Krajeńskie; Gmina Zwierzyn

Area
  - Total: 1,248.32 km^{2} (481.98 sq mi)

Population (2019-06-30)
  - Total: 49,156
  - Density: 39.378/km^{2} (101.99/sq mi)
  - Urban: 23,133
  - Rural: 26,023
- Car plates: FSD
- Website: http://www.fsd.pl

Strzelce–Drezdenko County (Polish: powiat strzelecko-drezdenecki) is a unit of territorial administration and local government (powiat) in Lubusz Voivodeship, western Poland. It came into being on 1 January 1999 as a result of the Polish local government reforms passed in 1998. Its administrative seat is the town of Strzelce Krajeńskie, which lies 25 km (16 mi) north-east of Gorzów Wielkopolski and 104 km (65 mi) north of Zielona Góra. The county also contains the towns of Drezdenko, lying 21 km (13 mi) east of Strzelce Krajeńskie, and Dobiegniew, 18 km (11 mi) north-east of Strzelce Krajeńskie.

The county covers an area of 1,248.32 square kilometres (482.0 sq mi). As of 2019 its total population is 49,156, out of which the population of Drezdenko is 10,122, that of Strzelce Krajeńskie is 9,950, that of Dobiegniew is 3,061, and the rural population is 26,023.

== Neighbouring counties ==
Strzelce–Drezdenko County is bordered by Choszczno County to the north, Wałcz County to the north-east, Czarnków-Trzcianka County to the east, Międzychód County to the south-east, Międzyrzecz County to the south, Gorzów County to the south-west and Myślibórz County to the west.

== Administrative divisions ==
The county is subdivided into five gminas (three urban-rural and two rural). These are listed in the following table, in descending order of population.

Gmina	Type	Area (km^{2})	Population (2019)	Seat
Gmina Drezdenko	urban-rural	399.9	17,166	Drezdenko
Gmina Strzelce Krajeńskie	urban-rural	318.6	17,052	Strzelce Krajeńskie
Gmina Dobiegniew	urban-rural	351.0	6,544	Dobiegniew
Gmina Zwierzyn	rural	101.0	4,335	Zwierzyn
Gmina Stare Kurowo	rural	77.9	4,059	Stare Kurowo
