= Tuczno (disambiguation) =

Tuczno is a town in Wałcz County, West Pomeranian Voivodeship in the north-west of Poland.

Tuczno may also refer to the following options:

- Tuczno Drugie
- Gmina Tuczno
- Tuczno, Kuyavian-Pomeranian Voivodeship (north-central Poland)
- Tuczno, Greater Poland Voivodeship (west-central Poland)
- Tuczno, Lubusz Voivodeship (west Poland)
- Tuczno Pierwsze
- Tuczno Trzecie
- Tuczno-Wieś

== See also ==
- Tuczenko (with Wilanów)
