= Franz von Brenkenhoff =

Financial advisor, builder, Prussia, 18th century

Franz Balthasar Schönberg von Brenkenhoff
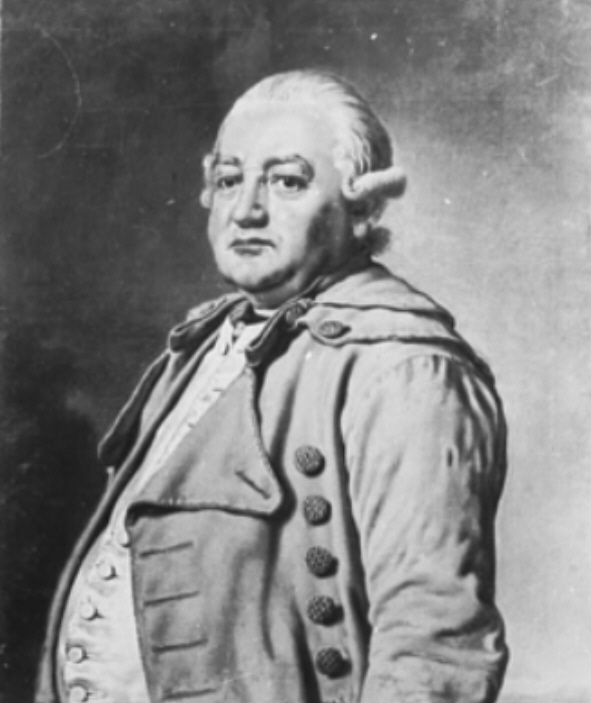
- Franz Balthasar Schönberg von Brenkenhoff
- Born: 15 June 1723; Reideburg, Province of Saxony, Prussia
- Died: 21 May 1780 (aged 56); Hohenkarzig bei Friedeberg (Neumark),Prussia
- Citizenship: Prussian
- Education: Government Official

Franz Balthasar Schönberg von Brenkenhoff (1723–1780) was a Prussian secret financial adviser. He was the head of the Netze District and the builder of the Bromberger Kanal.

== Life ==
The von Brenkenhoff family, originally from Westphalia, owned the Gorenzen estate near Mansfeld at the beginning of the 17th century. Franz's ancestor, Nikolaus von Brenkenhoff, was the first of the lineage to carry a title of nobility in the mid-seventeenth century.

Franz Balthasar Schönberg was born on 15 June 1723 in Reideburg, near Halle. He was the eldest son of Christine Sabine von Barsewisch, who died at a young age, and Julius, a rittmeister in the Austrian army, who died in 1738 fighting the Turks in Hungary. Two of Balthasar's brothers died in war.

As a young boy, he was left without a family or a livelihood. He entered the service of Leopold I, Prince of Anhalt-Dessau as a page. He gained recognition and respect from Leopold I, who entrusted him with carrying out works related to drainage and wet land reclamations on the Elbe river. Hence, while working with Materne, a Prussian engineer and builder, he learned the science of land development, performing measurements and leveling the soil. Furthermore, Franz acquired knowledge about horse breeding: he became very rich with this business. Thanks to this expertise, in 1745, he was appointed to the position of Master of the Horse of the Grand Duchy of Anhalt-Dessau.

There, he took up farming in the principality and was nominated director of the Economic Chamber. As cultivated land expanded and yields increased, the financial situation of the principality stabilized. The accumulated reserves helped supplying Frederick the Great's army in preparation of the Battle of Torgau (1760) during the Seven Years' War. It is highly likely that Balthasar's economic successes enabled him to enter civil service of the Kingdom of Prussia.

In June 1762, Franz von Brenkenhoff was appointed secret financial advisor and member of the war and finance councils. He was de facto the president of the governmental districts of Pomerania and Neumark. During his assignment, he dealt mainly with the reconstruction of cities ravaged the by war and the land drainage on the Noteć river combined with its using for agricultural crops. His seat was then in Drezdenko, where he will have his estate built afterwards.

In particular he developed and intensified crops culture:

- along the Warta river from 1763;
- in the area around the Miedwie lake (German: Madüesee) in 1769;
- in the Thurbruch region (a bogland area in the east of Usedom island) in 1771;
- in Plön's lowlands in 1774.

=== Founder of the Netze District ===
Shortly before the First Partition of Poland on 6 February 1772, Frederick the Great assigned him the secret mission to determine the potential and the economic conditions of the future annexed Polish lands. To that end, Brenkenhoff contacted Countess Skórzewska, one of his acquaintances. He visited her at the Lubostroń Palace in spring 1772, while collecting demography data in the area.

Franz was also interested in the condition of waterways, especially the Noteć river, which annual floodings were regularly destroying the crops at the Skórzewski's Palace. It may have been the initial trigger for him to devise a link between the Noteć and the Brda rivers. He reported his observations to Frederick II in June 1772, during a meeting which took place in Bydgoszcz, where the monarch stopped on his way from Königsberg. Once the First Partition achieved, the territory boarding the Noteć River became part of the Kingdom of Prussia: Brenkenhoff was then responsible for establishing the borders and the administrative divisions of the annexed lands. In 1772, he led the seizure commission for the Netze District (German: Netzedistrikt-Polish: Obwód Nadnotecki) as a representative of the king and received the homage of the estates in Inowroclaw.

The initial Prussian plan was to incorporate the new areas into the Neumark-East Brandenburg region, with Kostrzyn nad Odrą as the administrative main city. A different scheme was presented by von Brenkenhoff in February 1773: he suggested the creation of a new district with Bydgoszcz/Bromberg as its administrative seat. The rationale for this proposal was the expected economic boom of the entire area, thanks to the construction of the Bydgoszcz Canal.

Although Frederick did not fully share Brenckenhoff's enthusiasm, he temporarily established in 1774 a local Commission seating in Bydgoszcz/Bromberg. The Prussian Lieutenant General Von Gaudi was the director of the council and von Brenckenhoff was in charge of its administrative supervision. He played the role of the royal administrator acting as the intermediary with the monarch. He was responsible for the general development of the district and its development for the benefit of the Kingdom of Prussia. This position was unprecedented within the Prussian administration, considered as a bespoke post created in recognition of his merits.

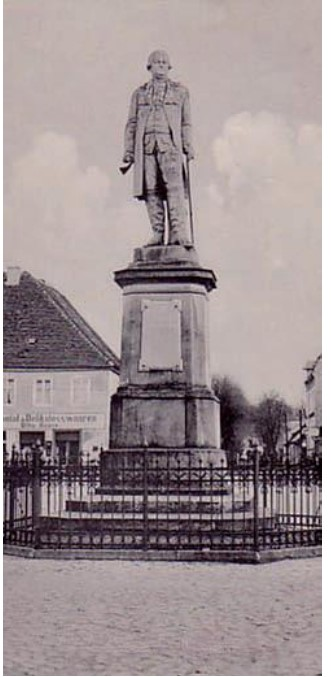
Brenckenhoff Monument in Drezdenko (now gone)

=== Builder of the Bydgoszcz Canal ===
In September 1772, Frederick the Great gave him the administrative supervision and organization of the construction of the Bydgoszcz Canal. First earthworks began in the spring 1773, Brenkenhoff hiring up to 8000 workers coming from inland Prussia (Mecklenburg, Dessau, Thuringia, Saxony) and from Bohemia. The size of the project required establishing three colonies along its path, settling bakeries, breeding cattle for slaughter and setting up dedicated lazarettos due to high level of illness (malaria, dysentery, colds) among the labor, which was caused by a poor sanitation in difficult outdoor conditions. The building took only 18 months and was completed in September 1774.

This achievement coincided with the end of Brenckenhoff's career. In late July 1774, he was suffering a serious bleeding condition, which impaired his health. In such circumstances Frederick II handed over his duties to Johann Friedrich Domhardt, the president of West Prussia. Franz von Brenkenhoff was finally released from the Prussian administration of the Netze District in 1775.

At the time of his departure, accusations of bad finance managements were raised, in particular linked to the excessive construction costs of the canal. Far from being legitimated, the answer to these claims led von Brenkenhoff to lose part of his personal property. The last blow was a king's letter from March 1780, charging him of inconsistency in the accounts with the royal intention to conduct a financial audit. Following this news, Franz died on 21 May 1780 of asthma attack on his estate in Gardzko (German: Hohenkarzig). von Brenckenhoff was buried in the nearby church in Licheń.

His descendants got back his possessions years later by way of grace of Frederick William II.

=== Family ===
Franz von Brenkenhoff married twice. His first marriage to Louise von Bergen ended in a divorce in 1774. The couple had two children. Their son Leopold (1750–1799) became a soldier and military writer. He served in the Saxe army then joined the Prussian forces. He reached the position of adjutant general to Friedrich von Braunschweig and was awarded the Pour le Mérite on 17 October 1794.

The second wife was Elisabeth von Papstein, from Friedeberg in der Neumark. They had five children, among whom:

- Leopoldine Frederika Eleonora Gottliebe.
- Franziska Karoline Philippine Elisabeth (1775–1858) who married Wilhelm von Knobelsdorff-Brenkenhoff (1769–1848), a knight of the Order of St. John and owner of the Mansfelde manor near Friedeberg. As a Dragoons Lieutenant Colonel, he volunteered in the 1st Neumark Landwehr Cavalry Regiment in 1812 and took part in the campaign against Napoleon (1813-1815). They had seven sons and one daughter; The Knobelsdorff-Brenkenhoff family remained in possession of the property in Friedeberg -today's Lipie Góry- until the beginning 1945.

== Commemoration ==
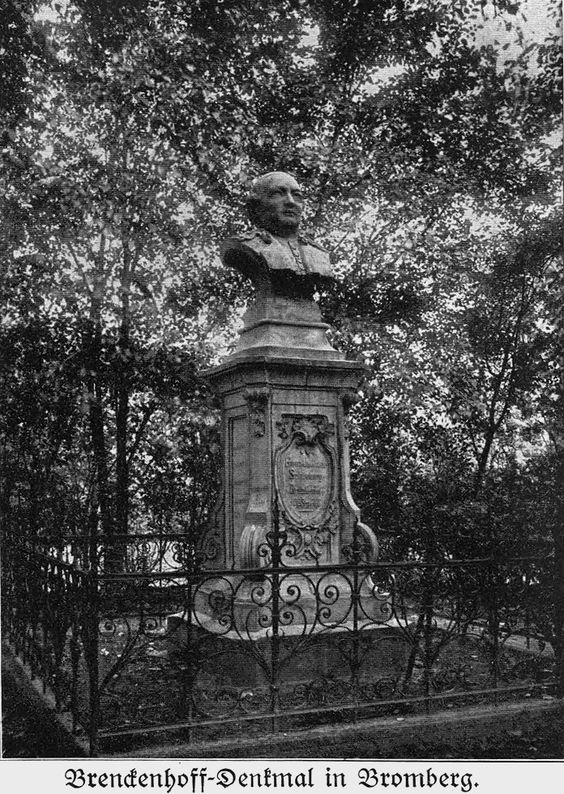
Monument to Franz von Brenkenhoff, 1914

- The "Historical Society for the Netze distrikt" (German: Historische Gesellschaft für den Netzedistrikt) unveiled a monument to von Brenkenhoff on the bank of the then Bromberger Canal in Bydgoszcz/Bromberg on 27 October 1894. The metal bust was placed between the 2nd and 3rd locks, in the area of the present Artura Grottgera street. In July 1919, it was moved to Piła along with the equipment of the Provincial Office building at today's 25 Focha street.
- Under Prussian times and during the occupation, one of the streets in downtown was named after him (German: Brenkenhoffstraße): it is nowadays Bocianowo street.
- In 1882, a memorial to von Brenkenhoff was built in Drezdenko then Driesen an der Netze. It was set on the Neuer Markt. It was torn down in 1945.
- Franz von Brenkenhoff founded the settlement named Papsteinthal in honor of his second wife, now near Żoruchowo.
- Furthermore, other places have been founded by von Brenkenhoff:
  - Brenkenhof near Großderschau (1770);
  - Brenkenhofsthal, now Smołdziński Las (1777);
  - Papstein;
  - Brenkenhofswalde, now Jęczydół, a district of Kobylanka;
  - Brenkenhofsfleiß, now Krzeszyce.
- The Brenkenhofkanal was a narrow waterway in Stargard, linking the Krępiel river in the south to the Ina river. It was still visible on city maps in 1945.

== See also ==
- Bydgoszcz
- Bydgoszcz Canal
- Kingdom of Prussia
- Netze District

== Bibliography ==
- (in German) von Knobelsdorff-Brenkenhoff, Benno (1984). Eine Provinz im Frieden erobert. Brenckenhoff als Leiter des friderizianischen retablissements in Pommern 1762–1780. Köln: Grote. ISBN 9783774565142.
- (in German) Meißner, August Gottlieb (1782). Leben Franz Balthasar Schönberg von Brenkenhoff, Königl. Preuß. geim. Ober-Finanz-Kriegs- und Domainenrath. Leipzig: Breitkopf. ISBN 9783774565142.
- (in German) Spude, Franz (1880). Franz Baltasar Schönberg von Brenkenhof. Landsberg: Landsberg a. W.
- (in German) Skalweit, Stephan (1955). Brenkenhoff, Franz Balthasar v. Neue Deutsche Biographie. Band 2. Berlin: Duncker & Humblot. p. 584. ISBN 3428001834.
- (in Polish) Błażejewski Stanisław, Kutta Janusz, Romaniuk Marek (1994). Bydgoski Słownik Biograficzny. Tom I. Bydgoszcz: Kujawsko-Pomorskie Towarzystwo Kulturalne Wojewódzki Ośrodek Kultury.
- (in Polish) Franz Balthasar Schönberg von Brenckenhoff i jego dokonania w odbudowie Nowej Marchii po wojnie siedmioletniej i w zagospodarowaniu doliny Warty i Noteci. Drezdenko: Urza̢d Miejski. 210.
