= Sokolsko =

Sokolsko may refer to:

- Sokólsko, Poland
- Sokolsko, Kardzhali Province in Kardzhali Municipality, Bulgaria
