= Studnica =

Studnica may refer to the following:

Places

- Studnica, Lower Silesian Voivodeship, south-west Poland
- Studnica, Pomeranian Voivodeship, north Poland)
- Studnica, Warmian-Masurian Voivodeship}, north Poland)
- Studnica, West Pomeranian Voivodeship, north-west Poland
- Stara Studnica, Gmina Kalisz Pomorski, Poland
- Nowa Studnica, Gmina Tuczno, Poland
- Studnica lake, Poland

== See also ==
- Studnice (disambiguation)
