= Studnice =

Studnice may refer to places:

== Czech Republic ==
- Studnice (Chrudim District), a municipality and village in Pardubice Region
- Studnice (Náchod District), a municipality and village in Hradec Králové Region
- Studnice (Třebíč District), a municipality and village in Vysočina Region
- Studnice (Vyškov District), a municipality and village in South Moravian Region
- Studnice, a village and part of Lodhéřov in South Bohemian Region
- Studnice, a village and part of Nové Město na Moravě in Vysočina Region
- Studnice, a village and part of Telč in Vysočina Region
- Vysoké Studnice, a municipality and village in Vysočina Region

== Poland ==
- Studnice, Poland, a village

== See also ==
- Studnica (disambiguation)
