= Jamienko =

- Village
- Location within Poland
- Coordinates: 53°17′N 16°12′E
- Country: Poland
- Voivodeship: West Pomeranian
- County: Wałcz
- Gmina: Tuczno
- Population: 150
- Time zone: UTC+1 (CET)
  - Summer (DST): UTC+2 (CEST)
- Area code: +48 67
- Car plates: ZWA

Jamienko [jaˈmjɛnkɔ] (German: Königsgnade) is a village in the administrative district of Gmina Tuczno, within Wałcz County, West Pomeranian Voivodeship, in north-western Poland. It lies approximately 12 km (7 mi) north of Tuczno, 18 km (11 mi) west of Wałcz, and 109 km (68 mi) east of the regional capital Szczecin.

The village has a population of 150.
