= Bobrówko =

Bobrówko may refer to the following places:

- Bobrówko, Strzelce-Drezdenko County in Lubusz Voivodeship (west Poland)
- Bobrówko, Sulęcin County in Lubusz Voivodeship (west Poland)
- Bobrówko, Warmian-Masurian Voivodeship (north Poland)
