= Strzaliny =

- Village
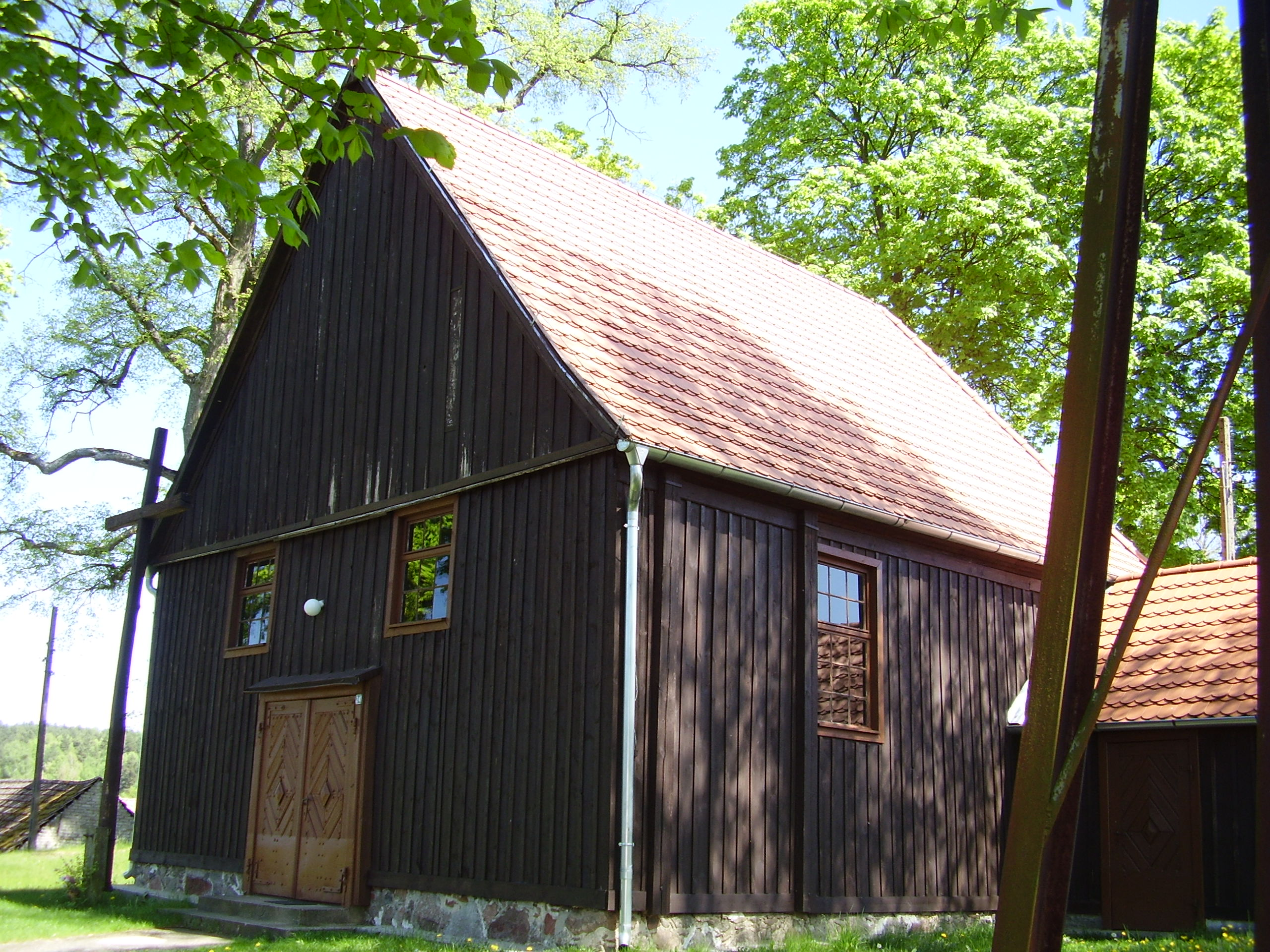
- Church of the Visitation in Strzaliny

- Location within Poland
- Coordinates: 53°11′30″N 16°9′10″E
- Country: Poland
- Voivodeship: West Pomeranian
- County: Wałcz
- Gmina: Tuczno
- Population: 190
- Time zone: UTC+1 (CET)
  - Summer (DST): UTC+2 (CEST)
- Area code: +48 67
- Car plates: ZWA

Strzaliny [stʂaˈlinɨ] (German: Strahlenberg) is a village in the administrative district of Gmina Tuczno, within Wałcz County, West Pomeranian Voivodeship, in north-western Poland. It lies approximately 2 km (1 mi) north-east of Tuczno, 23 km (14 mi) west of Wałcz, and 108 km (67 mi) east of the regional capital Szczecin.

In the village there is a historic wooden church of the Visitation, dating back to the 17th century.

Before 1772 the area was part of Kingdom of Poland, and in 1772–1945 it belonged to Prussia and Germany. For more on its history, see Wałcz County.
