= Jeziorki, Wałcz County =

Jeziorki
- Village
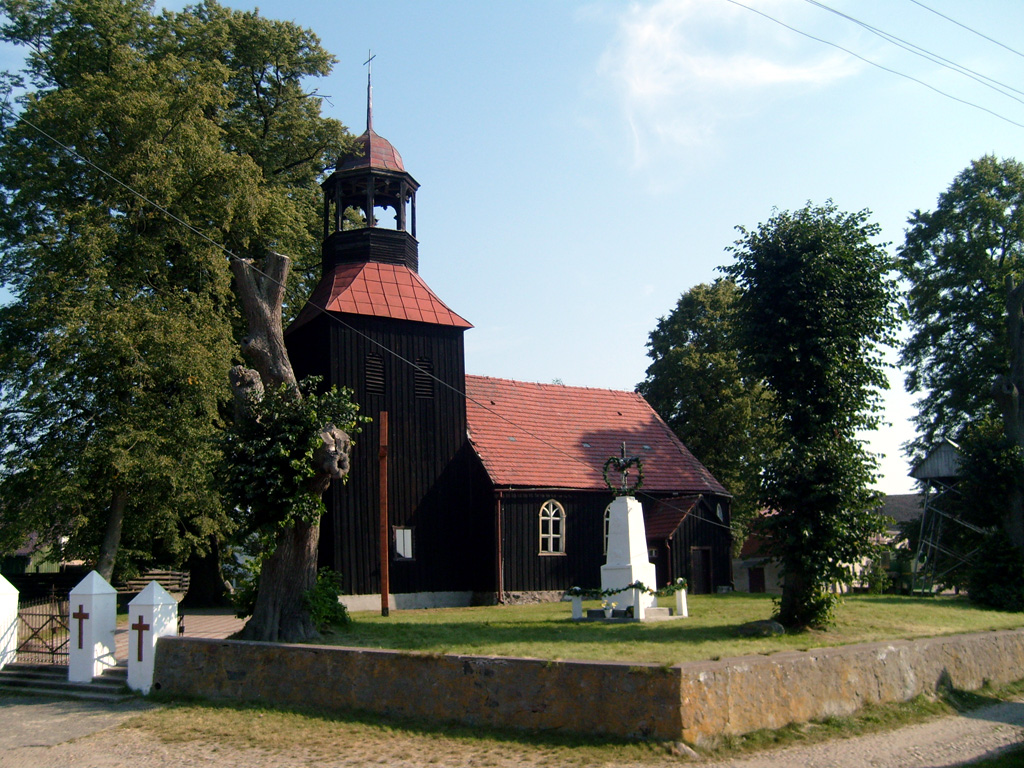
- Exaltation of the Holy Cross church in Jeziorki

- Location within Poland
- Coordinates: 53°14′15″N 16°6′35″E
- Country: Poland
- Voivodeship: West Pomeranian
- County: Wałcz
- Gmina: Tuczno
- Population: 280
- Time zone: UTC+1 (CET)
  - Summer (DST): UTC+2 (CEST)
- Area code: +48 67
- Car plates: ZWA

Jeziorki [jɛˈʑɔrki] (German: Schulzendorf) is a village in the administrative district of Gmina Tuczno, within Wałcz County, West Pomeranian Voivodeship, in north-western Poland. It lies approximately 7 km (4 mi) north of Tuczno, 24 km (15 mi) west of Wałcz, and 104 km (65 mi) east of the regional capital Szczecin.

The village has a population of 280.

In the village there is a historic wooden church of the Exaltation of the Holy Cross and a railway station.

Before 1772 the area was part of Kingdom of Poland, 1772-1945 Prussia and Germany. For more on its history, see Wałcz County.
