= Rzeczyca, West Pomeranian Voivodeship =

Rzeczyca
- Village
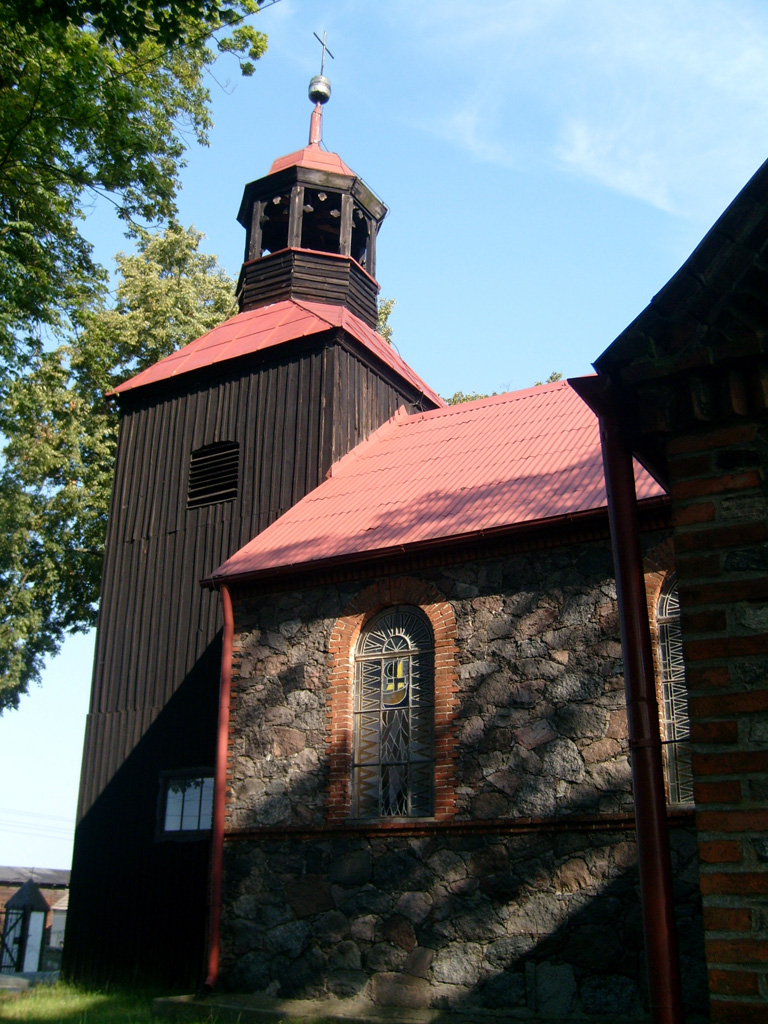
- Saint Bartholomew church in Rzeczyca

- Location within Poland
- Coordinates: 53°14′55″N 16°8′9″E
- Country: Poland
- Voivodeship: West Pomeranian
- County: Wałcz
- Gmina: Tuczno
- Population: 230
- Time zone: UTC+1 (CET)
  - Summer (DST): UTC+2 (CEST)
- Area code: +48 67
- Car plates: ZWA

Rzeczyca [ʐɛˈt͡ʂɨt͡sa] (German: Knakendorf) is a village in the administrative district of Gmina Tuczno, within Wałcz County, West Pomeranian Voivodeship, in north-western Poland. It lies approximately 8 km (5 mi) north of Tuczno, 23 km (14 mi) west of Wałcz, and 105 km (65 mi) east of the regional capital Szczecin.

The village has a population of 230.

There is a historic church of Saint Bartholomew in the village.

For the history of the region, see History of Pomerania.
