= Krępa Krajeńska =

- Village
- Location within Poland
- Coordinates: 53°13′16″N 16°3′26″E
- Country: Poland
- Voivodeship: West Pomeranian
- County: Wałcz
- Gmina: Tuczno
- Population: 90
- Time zone: UTC+1 (CET)
  - Summer (DST): UTC+2 (CEST)
- Area code: +48 67
- Car plates: ZWA

Krępa Krajeńska [ˈkrɛmpa kraˈjɛɲska] (German: Crampe) is a village in the administrative district of Gmina Tuczno, within Wałcz County, West Pomeranian Voivodeship, in north-western Poland. It lies approximately 7 km (4 mi) north-west of Tuczno, 28 km (17 mi) west of Wałcz, and 101 km (63 mi) east of the regional capital Szczecin.

The village has a population of 90.

Before 1772 the area was part of Kingdom of Poland, 1772-1945 Prussia and Germany. For more on its history, see Wałcz County.

There is a train station in the village.
