= Bytyń, West Pomeranian Voivodeship =

Bytyń
- Village
- Location within Poland
- Coordinates: 53°15′45″N 16°14′1″E
- Country: Poland
- Voivodeship: West Pomeranian
- County: Wałcz
- Gmina: Tuczno
- Population: 10
- Time zone: UTC+1 (CET)
  - Summer (DST): UTC+2 (CEST)
- Area code: +48 67
- Car plates: ZWA

Bytyń [ˈbɨtɨɲ] (German: Böthin) is a village in the administrative district of Gmina Tuczno, within Wałcz County, West Pomeranian Voivodeship, in north-western Poland. It lies approximately 12 km (7 mi) north-east of Tuczno, 16 km (10 mi) west of Wałcz, and 112 km (70 mi) east of the regional capital Szczecin.

The village has a population of 10.

Before 1772 the area was part of Kingdom of Poland, 1772-1945 Prussia and Germany. For more on its history, see Wałcz County.
