= Wrzosy, West Pomeranian Voivodeship =

Wrzosy
- Village
- Location within Poland
- Coordinates: 53°14′2″N 16°9′40″E
- Country: Poland
- Voivodeship: West Pomeranian
- County: Wałcz
- Gmina: Tuczno
- Population: 170
- Time zone: UTC+1 (CET)
  - Summer (DST): UTC+2 (CEST)
- Area code: +48 67
- Car plates: ZWA

Wrzosy [ˈvʐɔsɨ] is a village in the administrative district of Gmina Tuczno, within Wałcz County, West Pomeranian Voivodeship, in north-western Poland. It lies approximately 6 km (4 mi) north of Tuczno, 21 km (13 mi) west of Wałcz, and 107 km (66 mi) east of the regional capital Szczecin.

The village has a population of 170.

Before 1772 the area was part of Kingdom of Poland, 1772-1945 Prussia and Germany. For more on its history, see Wałcz County.
