= Lubiesz, Wałcz County =

Lubiesz
- Village
- Location within Poland
- Coordinates: 53°15′N 16°11′E
- Country: Poland
- Voivodeship: West Pomeranian
- County: Wałcz
- Gmina: Tuczno
- Population: 230
- Time zone: UTC+1 (CET)
  - Summer (DST): UTC+2 (CEST)
- Area code: +48 67
- Car plates: ZWA

Lubiesz [ˈlubjɛʂ] (German: Lubsdorf) is a village in the administrative district of Gmina Tuczno, within Wałcz County, West Pomeranian Voivodeship, in north-western Poland. It lies approximately 9 km (6 mi) north-east of Tuczno, 19 km (12 mi) west of Wałcz, and 108 km (67 mi) east of the regional capital Szczecin.

The village has a population of 230.

Before 1772 the area was part of Kingdom of Poland, 1772-1945 Prussia and Germany. For more on its history, see Wałcz County.
