= Złotowo, West Pomeranian Voivodeship =

Złotowo
- Settlement
- Location within Poland
- Coordinates: 53°12′51″N 16°5′54″E
- Country: Poland
- Voivodeship: West Pomeranian
- County: Wałcz
- Gmina: Tuczno
- Population: 30
- Time zone: UTC+1 (CET)
  - Summer (DST): UTC+2 (CEST)
- Area code: +48 67
- Car plates: ZWA

Złotowo [zwɔˈtɔvɔ] (German: Flathe) is a settlement in the administrative district of Gmina Tuczno, within Wałcz County, West Pomeranian Voivodeship, in north-western Poland. It lies approximately 5 km (3 mi) north-west of Tuczno, 26 km (16 mi) west of Wałcz, and 104 km (65 mi) east of the regional capital Szczecin.

The settlement has a population of 30.
