= Próchnówko =

- Village
- Location within Poland
- Coordinates: 53°17′35″N 16°13′52″E
- Country: Poland
- Voivodeship: West Pomeranian
- County: Wałcz
- Gmina: Tuczno
- Population: 20
- Time zone: UTC+1 (CET)
  - Summer (DST): UTC+2 (CEST)
- Area code: +48 67
- Car plates: ZWA

Próchnówko [pruxˈnufkɔ] (German: Neu-Prochnow) is a village in the administrative district of Gmina Tuczno, within Wałcz County, West Pomeranian Voivodeship, in north-western Poland. It lies approximately 14 km (9 mi) north-east of Tuczno, 16 km (10 mi) west of Wałcz, and 111 km (69 mi) east of the regional capital Szczecin.

The village has a population of 20.
