= Martew =

- Village
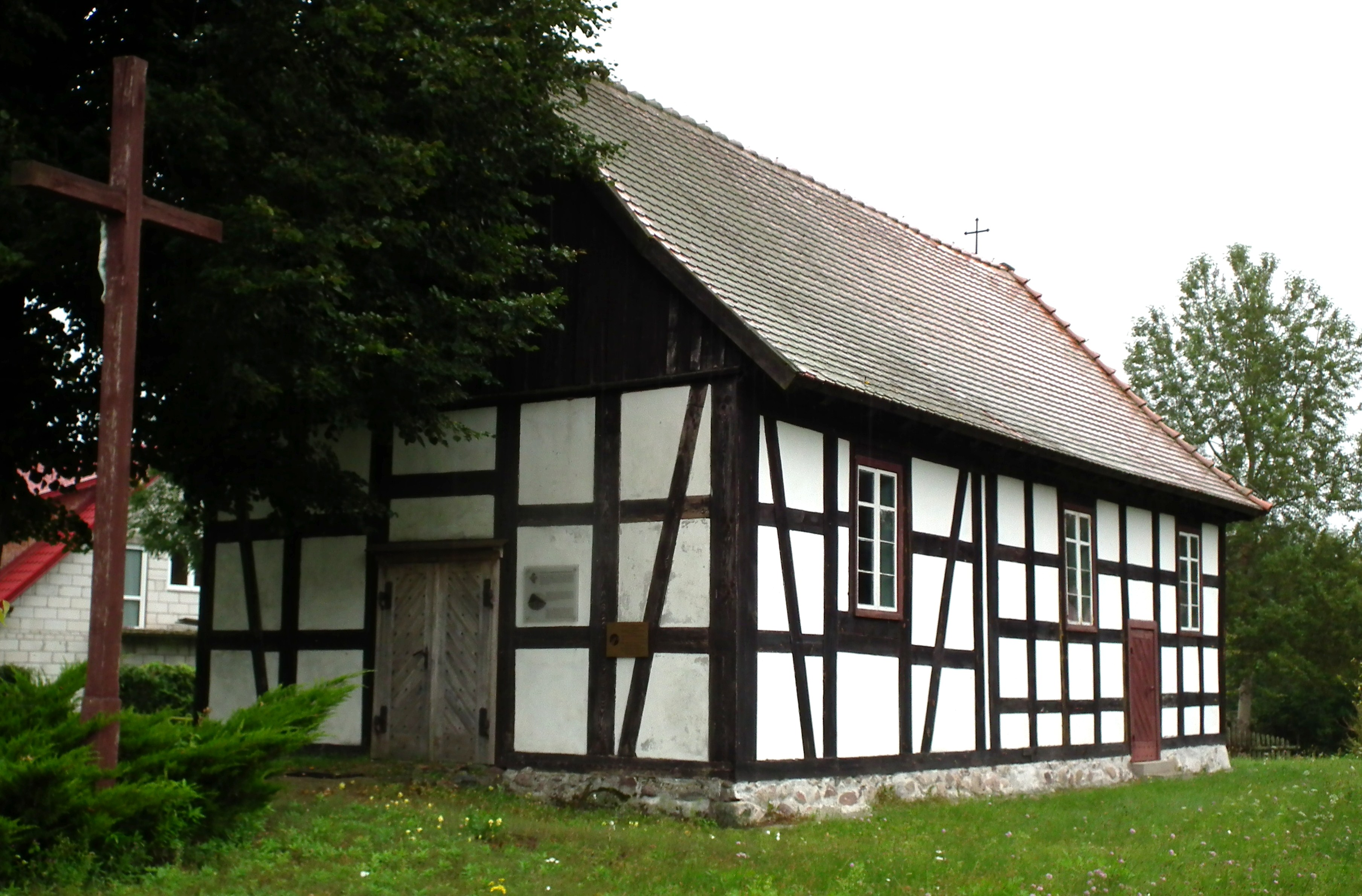
- Our Lady of the Rosary church in Martew

- Location within Poland
- Coordinates: 53°10′N 16°6′E
- Country: Poland
- Voivodeship: West Pomeranian
- County: Wałcz
- Gmina: Tuczno
- Population: 100
- Time zone: UTC+1 (CET)
  - Summer (DST): UTC+2 (CEST)
- Area code: +48 67
- Car plates: ZWA

Martew [ˈmartɛf] (German: Marthe) is a village in the administrative district of Gmina Tuczno, within Wałcz County, West Pomeranian Voivodeship, in north-western Poland. It lies approximately 3 km (2 mi) south-west of Tuczno, 27 km (17 mi) south-west of Wałcz, and 105 km (65 mi) east of the regional capital Szczecin.

The village has a population of 100.

In the village there is a historic half-timbered church of Our Lady of the Rosary, dating back to the 17th century.

Before 1772 the area was part of Kingdom of Poland, 1772-1945 Prussia and Germany. For more on its history, see Wałcz County.
