= Płociczno, West Pomeranian Voivodeship =

Płociczno
- Village
- Location within Poland
- Coordinates: 53°16′N 16°7′E
- Country: Poland
- Voivodeship: West Pomeranian
- County: Wałcz
- Gmina: Tuczno
- Population: 330
- Time zone: UTC+1 (CET)
  - Summer (DST): UTC+2 (CEST)
- Area code: +48 67
- Car plates: ZWA

Płociczno [pwɔˈt͡ɕit͡ʂnɔ] (German: Spechtsdorf) is a village in the administrative district of Gmina Tuczno, within Wałcz County, West Pomeranian Voivodeship, in north-western Poland. It lies approximately 10 km (6 mi) north of Tuczno, 24 km (15 mi) west of Wałcz, and 104 km (65 mi) east of the regional capital Szczecin.

The village has a population of 330.
