= Lubowo, Wałcz County =

Lubowo
- Settlement
- Location within Poland
- Coordinates: 53°14′17″N 16°10′47″E
- Country: Poland
- Voivodeship: West Pomeranian
- County: Wałcz
- Gmina: Tuczno
- Time zone: UTC+1 (CET)
  - Summer (DST): UTC+2 (CEST)
- Area code: +48 67
- Car plates: ZWA

Lubowo [luˈbɔvɔ] is a settlement in the administrative district of Gmina Tuczno, within Wałcz County, West Pomeranian Voivodeship, in north-western Poland. It lies approximately 7 km (4 mi) north-east of Tuczno, 20 km (12 mi) west of Wałcz, and 108 km (67 mi) east of the regional capital Szczecin.
