= Marcinkowice, West Pomeranian Voivodeship =

Marcinkowice
- Village
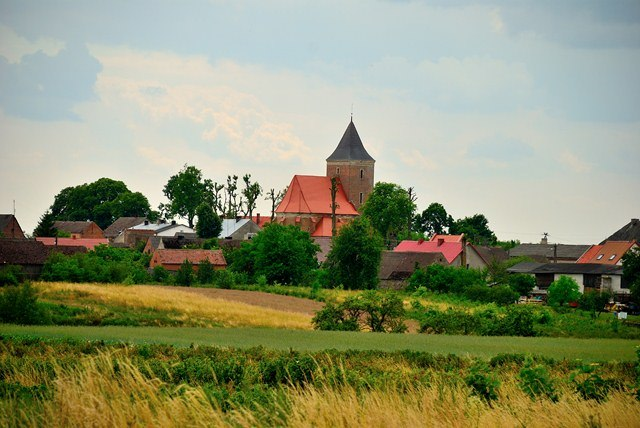

- Location within Poland
- Coordinates: 53°16′N 16°11′E
- Country: Poland
- Voivodeship: West Pomeranian
- County: Wałcz
- Gmina: Tuczno
- Population: 650
- Time zone: UTC+1 (CET)
  - Summer (DST): UTC+2 (CEST)
- Area code: +48 67
- Car plates: ZWA

Marcinkowice [mart͡ɕinkɔˈvit͡sɛ] (German: Marzdorf) is a village in the administrative district of Gmina Tuczno, within Wałcz County, West Pomeranian Voivodeship, in north-western Poland. It lies approximately 10 km (6 mi) north of Tuczno, 19 km (12 mi) west of Wałcz, and 108 km (67 mi) east of the regional capital Szczecin.

The village has a population of 650.

In the village there is a historic late Gothic church of St. Catherine and an elementary school.

For the history of the region, see History of Pomerania.
