= Miłogoszcz, Wałcz County =

Miłogoszcz
- Village
- Location within Poland
- Coordinates: 53°9′N 16°12′E
- Country: Poland
- Voivodeship: West Pomeranian
- County: Wałcz
- Gmina: Tuczno
- Population: 120
- Time zone: UTC+1 (CET)
  - Summer (DST): UTC+2 (CEST)
- Area code: +48 67
- Car plates: ZWA

Miłogoszcz [miˈwɔɡɔʂt͡ʂ] (German: Mehlgast) is a village in the administrative district of Gmina Tuczno, within Wałcz County, West Pomeranian Voivodeship, in north-western Poland. It lies approximately 6 km (4 mi) south-east of Tuczno, 22 km (14 mi) south-west of Wałcz, and 112 km (70 mi) east of the regional capital Szczecin.

Before 1772 the area was part of Kingdom of Poland, and in 1772–1945 it belonged to Prussia and Germany. For more on its history, see Wałcz County.
