= Ponikiew =

Ponikiew may refer to the following places:

- Ponikiew, Lesser Poland Voivodeship (south Poland)
- Ponikiew, Masovian Voivodeship (east-central Poland)
- Ponikiew, West Pomeranian Voivodeship (north-west Poland)
