= Danków, Lubusz Voivodeship =

Danków
- Village
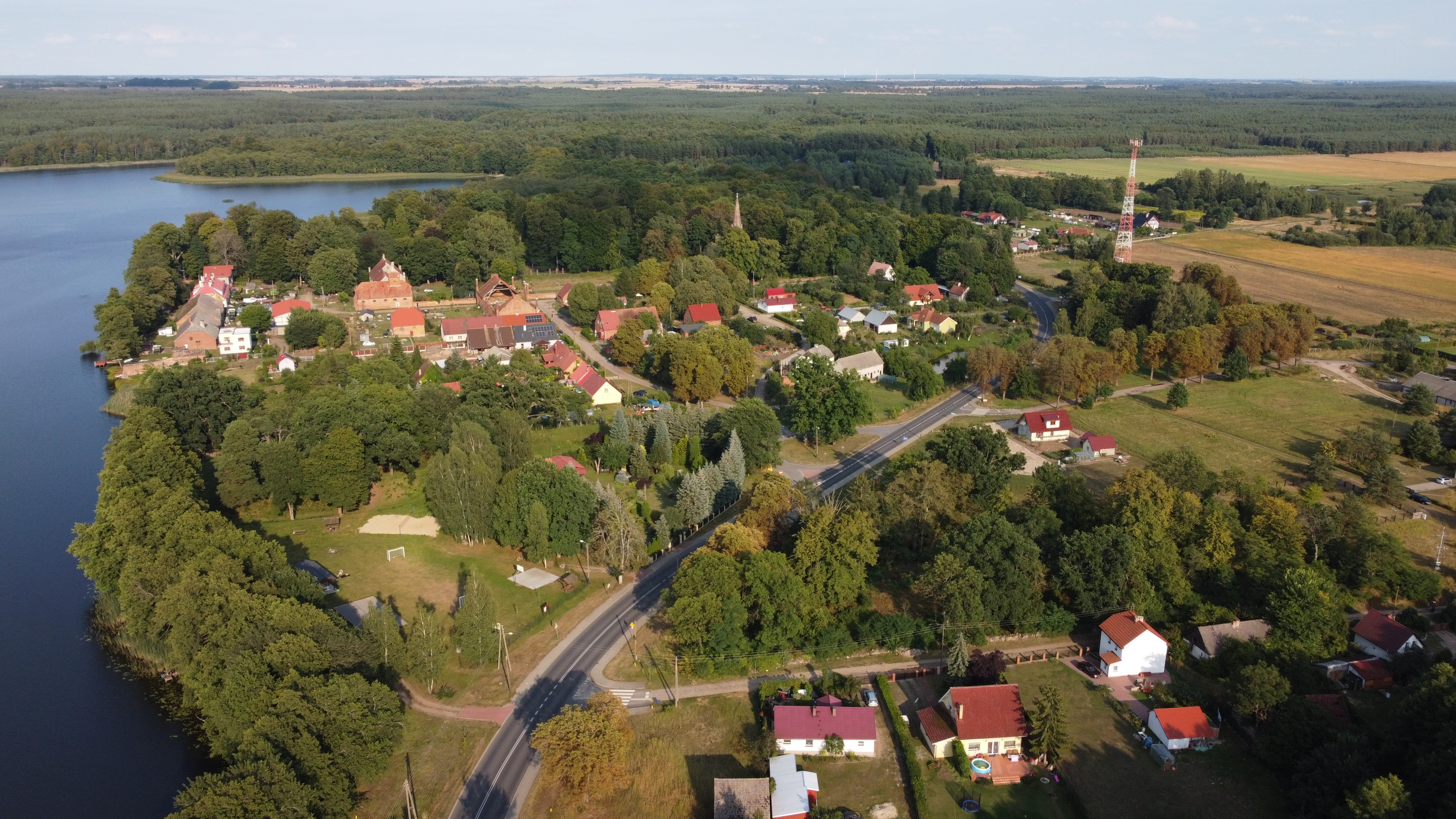
- Aerial view of Danków

- Location within Poland
- Coordinates: 52°52′17″N 15°21′22″E
- Country: Poland
- Voivodeship: Lubusz
- County: Strzelce-Drezdenko
- Gmina: Strzelce Krajeńskie

Population
  - Total: 127 (2,011)
- Time zone: UTC+1 (CET)
  - Summer (DST): UTC+2 (CEST)
- Vehicle registration: FSG

Danków [ˈdankuf] (German: Tankow) is a village in the administrative district of Gmina Strzelce Krajeńskie, within Strzelce-Drezdenko County, Lubusz Voivodeship, in western Poland.

During World War II, the German Nazi administration operated a forced labour subcamp of the Stalag II-D prisoner-of-war camp in the village.
