= Długie, Strzelce-Drezdenko County =

Długie
- Village
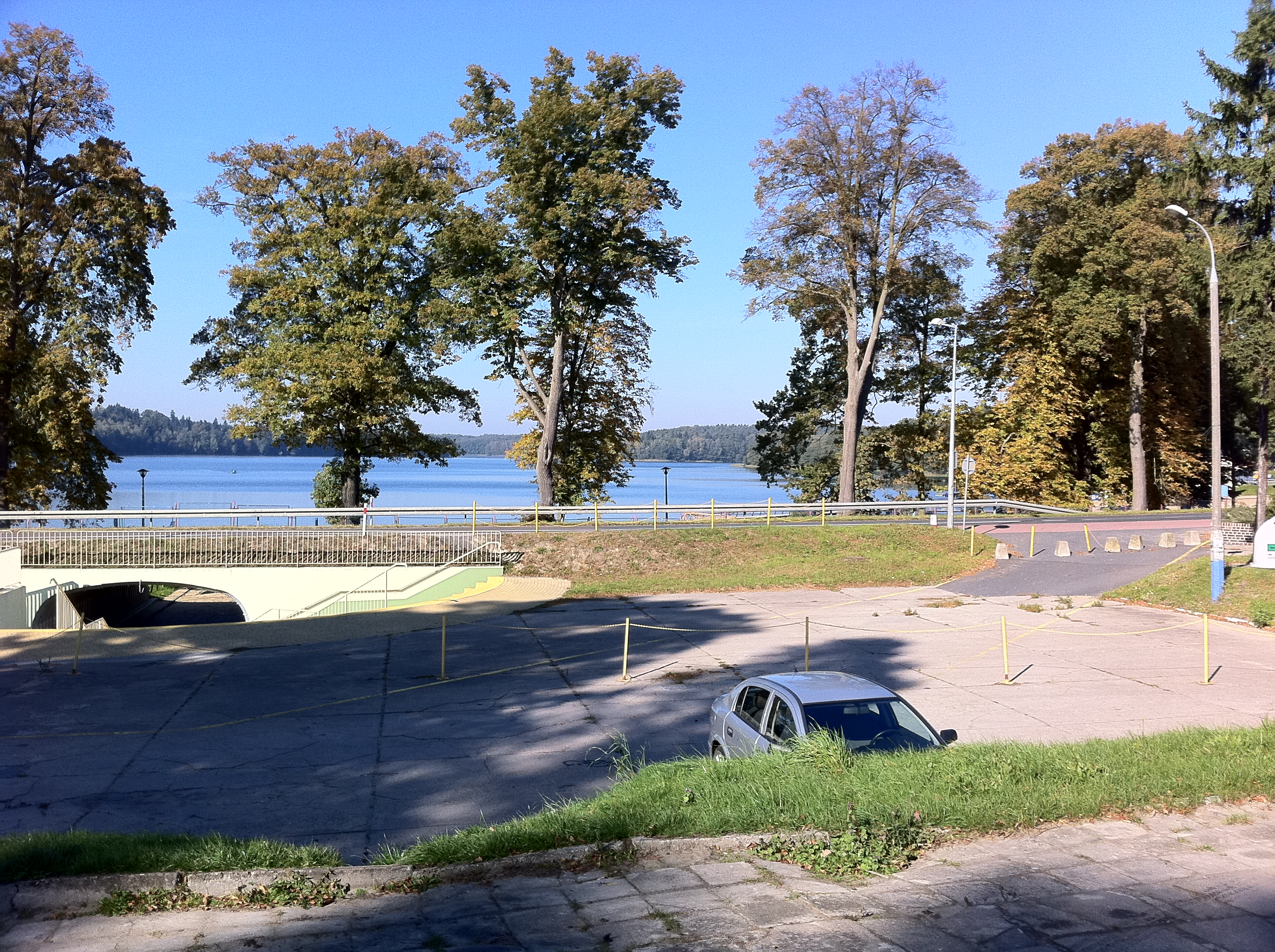

- Location within Poland
- Coordinates: 52°55′N 15°39′E
- Country: Poland
- Voivodeship: Lubusz
- County: Strzelce-Drezdenko
- Gmina: Strzelce Krajeńskie
- Population: 60

Długie [ˈdwuɡʲɛ] (German: Dolgen) is a village in the administrative district of Gmina Strzelce Krajeńskie, within Strzelce-Drezdenko County, Lubusz Voivodeship, in western Poland.
