= Ciecierzyn, Lubusz Voivodeship =

Ciecierzyn
- Village
- Location within Poland
- Coordinates: 52°51′41″N 15°32′13″E
- Country: Poland
- Voivodeship: Lubusz
- County: Strzelce-Drezdenko
- Gmina: Strzelce Krajeńskie

Ciecierzyn [t͡ɕɛˈt͡ɕɛʐɨn] is a village in the administrative district of Gmina Strzelce Krajeńskie, within Strzelce-Drezdenko County, Lubusz Voivodeship, in western Poland.
