= Lubicz, Lubusz Voivodeship =

Lubicz
- Village
- Location within Poland
- Coordinates: 52°57′N 15°31′E
- Country: Poland
- Voivodeship: Lubusz
- County: Strzelce-Drezdenko
- Gmina: Strzelce Krajeńskie

Lubicz [ˈlubit͡ʂ] is a village in the administrative district of Gmina Strzelce Krajeńskie, within Strzelce-Drezdenko County, Lubusz Voivodeship, in western Poland.
