= Brzoza, Lubusz Voivodeship =

Brzoza
- Village
- Location within Poland
- Coordinates: 52°51′57″N 15°29′6″E
- Country: Poland
- Voivodeship: Lubusz
- County: Strzelce-Drezdenko
- Gmina: Strzelce Krajeńskie
- Website: http://strzelce.pl

Brzoza [ˈbʐɔza] is a village in the administrative district of Gmina Strzelce Krajeńskie, within Strzelce-Drezdenko County, Lubusz Voivodeship, in western Poland.

The village was first mentioned as a possession of a knight in 1337. It was purchased in 1605 by Ernst von Schöning, the member of a well known Neumark family. The village was passed down, first to field marshal Hans Adam von Schoning, and then his son Johann Ludwig in 1696. In 1713, George Wilhelm von Schöning constructed a hunting castle and granary on the site.
