= Pieńkowice =

- Settlement
- Location within Poland
- Coordinates: 52°50′26″N 15°26′51″E
- Country: Poland
- Voivodeship: Lubusz
- County: Strzelce-Drezdenko
- Gmina: Strzelce Krajeńskie

Pieńkowice [pjɛɲkɔˈvit͡sɛ] is a settlement in the administrative district of Gmina Strzelce Krajeńskie, within Strzelce-Drezdenko County, Lubusz Voivodeship, in western Poland.
