= Golczewice =

- Village
- Location within Poland
- Coordinates: 52°51′09″N 15°34′16″E
- Country: Poland
- Voivodeship: Lubusz
- County: Strzelce-Drezdenko
- Gmina: Strzelce Krajeńskie

Golczewice [ɡɔlt͡ʂɛˈvit͡sɛ] is a village in the administrative district of Gmina Strzelce Krajeńskie, within Strzelce-Drezdenko County, Lubusz Voivodeship, in western Poland.
