= Nowa Studnica =

- Village
- Location within Poland
- Coordinates: 53°15′N 16°1′E
- Country: Poland
- Voivodeship: West Pomeranian
- County: Wałcz
- Gmina: Tuczno
- Population: 30
- Time zone: UTC+1 (CET)
  - Summer (DST): UTC+2 (CEST)
- Area code: +48 67
- Car plates: ZWA

Nowa Studnica [ˈnɔva studˈnit͡sa] (German: Neu Stüdnitz) is a village in the administrative district of Gmina Tuczno, within Wałcz County, West Pomeranian Voivodeship, in north-western Poland. It lies approximately 11 km (7 mi) north-west of Tuczno, 31 km (19 mi) west of Wałcz, and 98 km (61 mi) east of the regional capital Szczecin.

The village has a population of 30.
