= Gilów, Lubusz Voivodeship =

Gilów
- Village
- Location within Poland
- Coordinates: 52°59′N 15°33′E
- Country: Poland
- Voivodeship: Lubusz
- County: Strzelce-Drezdenko
- Gmina: Strzelce Krajeńskie

Gilów [ˈɡiluf] is a village in the administrative district of Gmina Strzelce Krajeńskie, within Strzelce-Drezdenko County, Lubusz Voivodeship, in western Poland.
