= Ogardzki Młyn =

- Settlement
- Location within Poland
- Coordinates: 52°58′34″N 15°36′50″E
- Country: Poland
- Voivodeship: Lubusz
- County: Strzelce-Drezdenko
- Gmina: Strzelce Krajeńskie

Ogardzki Młyn [ɔˈɡart͡ski ˈmwɨn] is a settlement in the administrative district of Gmina Strzelce Krajeńskie, within Strzelce-Drezdenko County, Lubusz Voivodeship, in western Poland.
