= Śródlesie, Lubusz Voivodeship =

Śródlesie
- Settlement
- Location within Poland
- Coordinates: 52°57′23″N 15°22′29″E
- Country: Poland
- Voivodeship: Lubusz
- County: Strzelce-Drezdenko
- Gmina: Strzelce Krajeńskie

Śródlesie [ɕruˈdlɛɕɛ] is a settlement in the administrative district of Gmina Strzelce Krajeńskie, within Strzelce-Drezdenko County, Lubusz Voivodeship, in western Poland.
