= Puszczykowo, Lubusz Voivodeship =

Puszczykowo
- Settlement
- Location within Poland
- Coordinates: 52°53′44″N 15°25′25″E
- Country: Poland
- Voivodeship: Lubusz
- County: Strzelce-Drezdenko
- Gmina: Strzelce Krajeńskie

Puszczykowo [puʂt͡ʂɨˈkɔvɔ] is a settlement in the administrative district of Gmina Strzelce Krajeńskie, within Strzelce-Drezdenko County, Lubusz Voivodeship, in western Poland.
