= Tuczno Drugie =

- Village
- Location within Poland
- Coordinates: 53°9′57″N 16°10′12″E
- Country: Poland
- Voivodeship: West Pomeranian
- County: Wałcz
- Gmina: Tuczno
- Population: 30
- Time zone: UTC+1 (CET)
  - Summer (DST): UTC+2 (CEST)
- Area code: +48 67
- Car plates: ZWA

Tuczno Drugie [ˈtut͡ʂnɔ ˈdruɡʲɛ] is a village in the administrative district of Gmina Tuczno, within Wałcz County, West Pomeranian Voivodeship, in north-western Poland. It lies approximately 4 km (2 mi) south-east of Tuczno, 23 km (14 mi) south-west of Wałcz, and 110 km (68 mi) east of the regional capital Szczecin.

The village has a population of 30.
