= Gmina Strzelce Krajeńskie =

Gmina Strzelce Krajeńskie Strzelce Krajeńskie Commune
- Gmina
- Flag Coat of arms
- Interactive map of Gmina Strzelce Krajeńskie
- Coordinates (Strzelce Krajeńskie): 52°52′32″N 15°31′55″E
- Country: Poland
- Voivodeship: Lubusz
- County: Strzelce-Drezdenko
- Seat: Strzelce Krajeńskie

Area
  - Total: 318.57 km^{2} (123.00 sq mi)

Population (2019-06-30)
  - Total: 17,052
  - Density: 53.527/km^{2} (138.63/sq mi)
  - Urban: 9,950
  - Rural: 7,102
- Website: https://www.strzelce.pl

Gmina Strzelce Krajeńskie is an urban-rural gmina (administrative district) in Strzelce-Drezdenko County, Lubusz Voivodeship, in western Poland. Its seat is the town of Strzelce Krajeńskie, which lies approximately 25 kilometres (16 mi) north-east of Gorzów Wielkopolski.

The gmina covers an area of 318.57 square kilometres (123.0 sq mi), and as of 2019 its total population is 17,052.

The gmina contains part of the protected area called Barlinek-Gorzów Landscape Park.

== Villages ==
Apart from the town of Strzelce Krajeńskie, Gmina Strzelce Krajeńskie contains the villages and settlements of Bobrówko, Bronowice, Brzoza, Buszewko, Buszów, Chwytowo, Ciecierzyn, Czyżewo, Danków, Długie, Gardzko, Gilów, Golczewice, Licheń, Lipie Góry, Lubicz, Machary, Małe Osiedle, Ogardy, Ogardzki Młyn, Piastowo, Pielice, Pieńkowice, Przyłęg, Puszczykowo, Sidłów, Sławno, Sokólsko, Śródlesie, Strzelce Klasztorne, Tuczenko, Tuczno, Wełmin, Wielisławice, Wilanów and Żabicko.

== Neighbouring gminas ==
Gmina Strzelce Krajeńskie is bordered by the gminas of Barlinek, Bierzwnik, Dobiegniew, Kłodawa, Krzęcin, Pełczyce, Santok, Stare Kurowo and Zwierzyn.

== Twin towns – sister cities ==
Gmina Strzelce Krajeńskie is twinned with:

- Angermünde, Germany
- Jammerbugt, Denmark
- Tornesch, Germany
