= Sidłów =

- Village
- Location within Poland
- Coordinates: 52°52′26″N 15°34′0″E
- Country: Poland
- Voivodeship: Lubusz
- County: Strzelce-Drezdenko
- Gmina: Strzelce Krajeńskie
- Population: 190

Sidłów [ˈɕidwuf] is a village in the administrative district of Gmina Strzelce Krajeńskie, within Strzelce-Drezdenko County, Lubusz Voivodeship, in western Poland.
