= Ogardy =

- Village
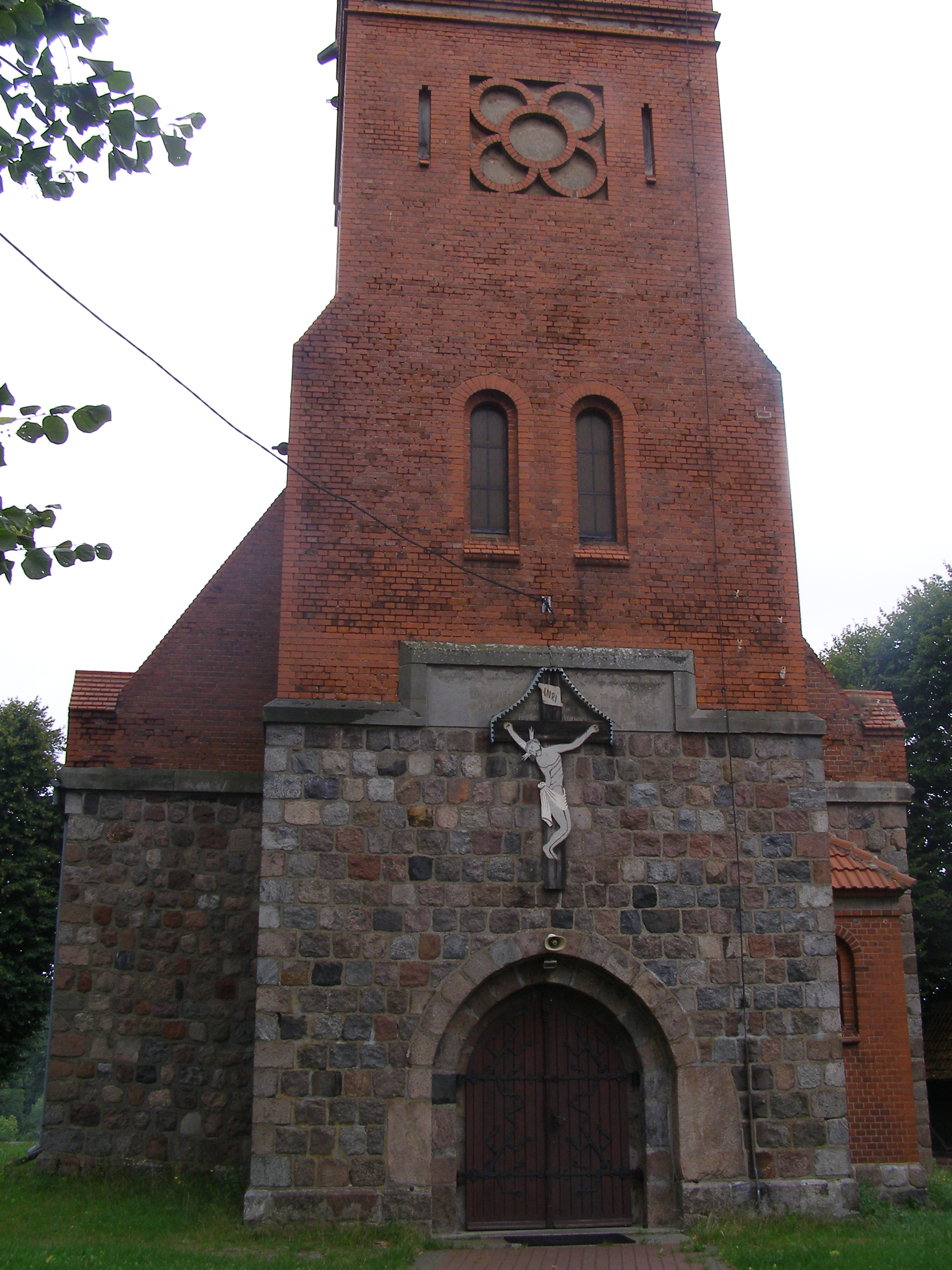
- Saint Stanislaus Kostka church in Ogardy

- Location within Poland
- Coordinates: 52°58′N 15°35′E
- Country: Poland
- Voivodeship: Lubusz
- County: Strzelce-Drezdenko
- Gmina: Strzelce Krajeńskie

Ogardy [ɔˈɡardɨ] is a village in the administrative district of Gmina Strzelce Krajeńskie, within Strzelce-Drezdenko County, Lubusz Voivodeship, in western Poland.

During World War II, the German Nazi government operated a forced labour subcamp of the Stalag II-D prisoner-of-war camp in the village.
