= Buszów, Strzelce-Drezdenko County =

Buszów
- Village
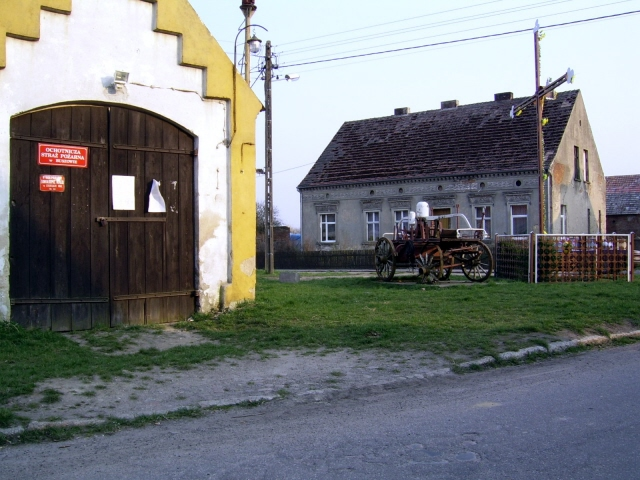

- Location within Poland
- Coordinates: 52°56′N 15°26′E
- Country: Poland
- Voivodeship: Lubusz
- County: Strzelce-Drezdenko
- Gmina: Strzelce Krajeńskie

Buszów [ˈbuʂuf] is a village in the administrative district of Gmina Strzelce Krajeńskie, within Strzelce-Drezdenko County, Lubusz Voivodeship, in western Poland.
