= Czyżewo, Lubusz Voivodeship =

Czyżewo
- Village
- Location within Poland
- Coordinates: 52°54′13″N 15°33′9″E
- Country: Poland
- Voivodeship: Lubusz
- County: Strzelce-Drezdenko
- Gmina: Strzelce Krajeńskie
- Population: 110

Czyżewo [t͡ʂɨˈʐɛvɔ] is a village in the administrative district of Gmina Strzelce Krajeńskie, within Strzelce-Drezdenko County, Lubusz Voivodeship, in western Poland.
