= Bronowice, Strzelce-Drezdenko County =

Bronowice
- Village
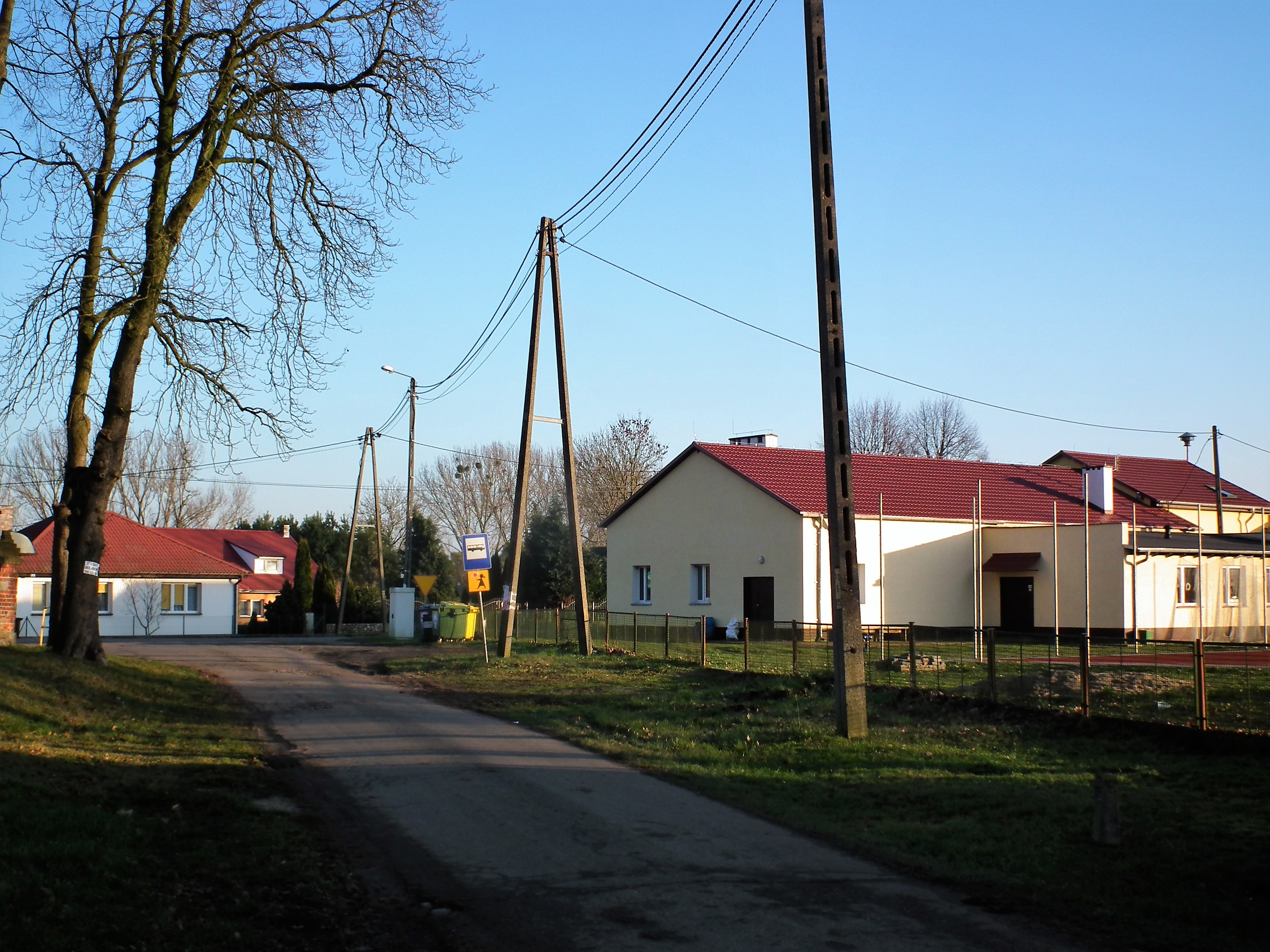

- Location within Poland
- Coordinates: 52°54′N 15°30′E
- Country: Poland
- Voivodeship: Lubusz
- County: Strzelce-Drezdenko
- Gmina: Strzelce Krajeńskie

Bronowice [brɔnɔˈvit͡sɛ] is a village in the administrative district of Gmina Strzelce Krajeńskie, within Strzelce-Drezdenko County, Lubusz Voivodeship, in western Poland.
