= Piastowo, Lubusz Voivodeship =

Piastowo
- Village
- Location within Poland
- Coordinates: 52°52′59″N 15°30′26″E
- Country: Poland
- Voivodeship: Lubusz
- County: Strzelce-Drezdenko
- Gmina: Strzelce Krajeńskie

Piastowo [pjasˈtɔvɔ] is a village in the administrative district of Gmina Strzelce Krajeńskie, within Strzelce-Drezdenko County, Lubusz Voivodeship, in western Poland.
