= Church of the Assumption of the Blessed Virgin Mary (Tuczno) =

Catholic parish church in Tuczno, Poland

Coordinates: 53.1919°N 16.1506°E

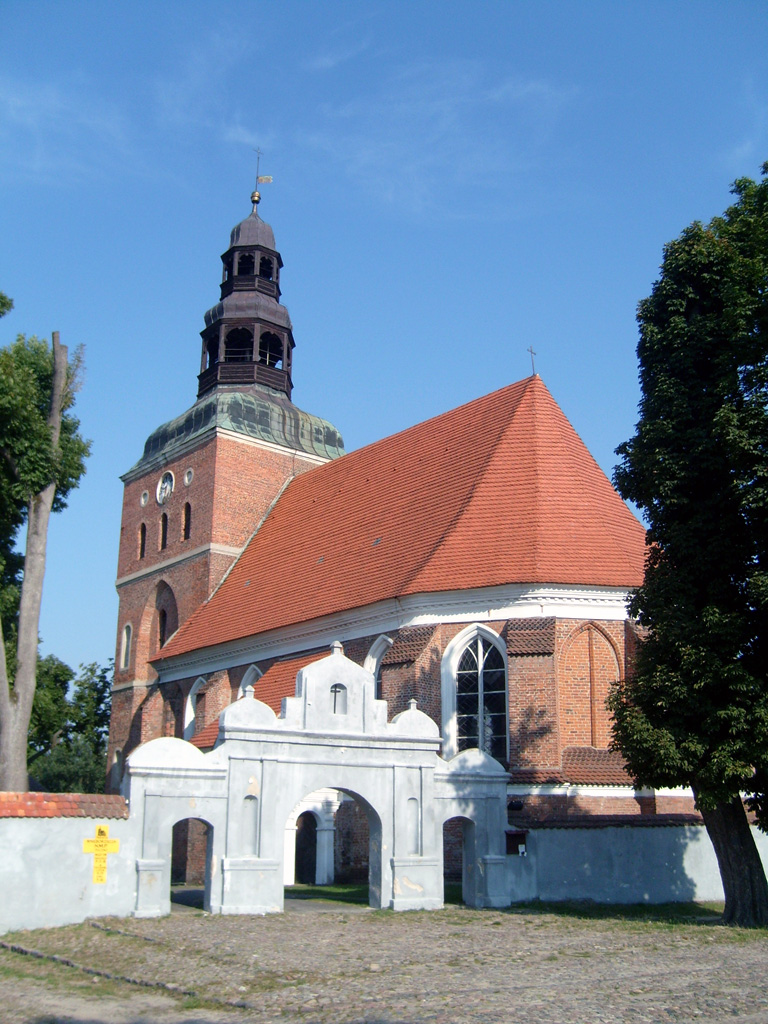
Church of the Assumption of the Blessed Virgin Mary

The Church of the Assumption of the Blessed Virgin Mary is a Catholic parish church in Tuczno, Poland.

== Location ==
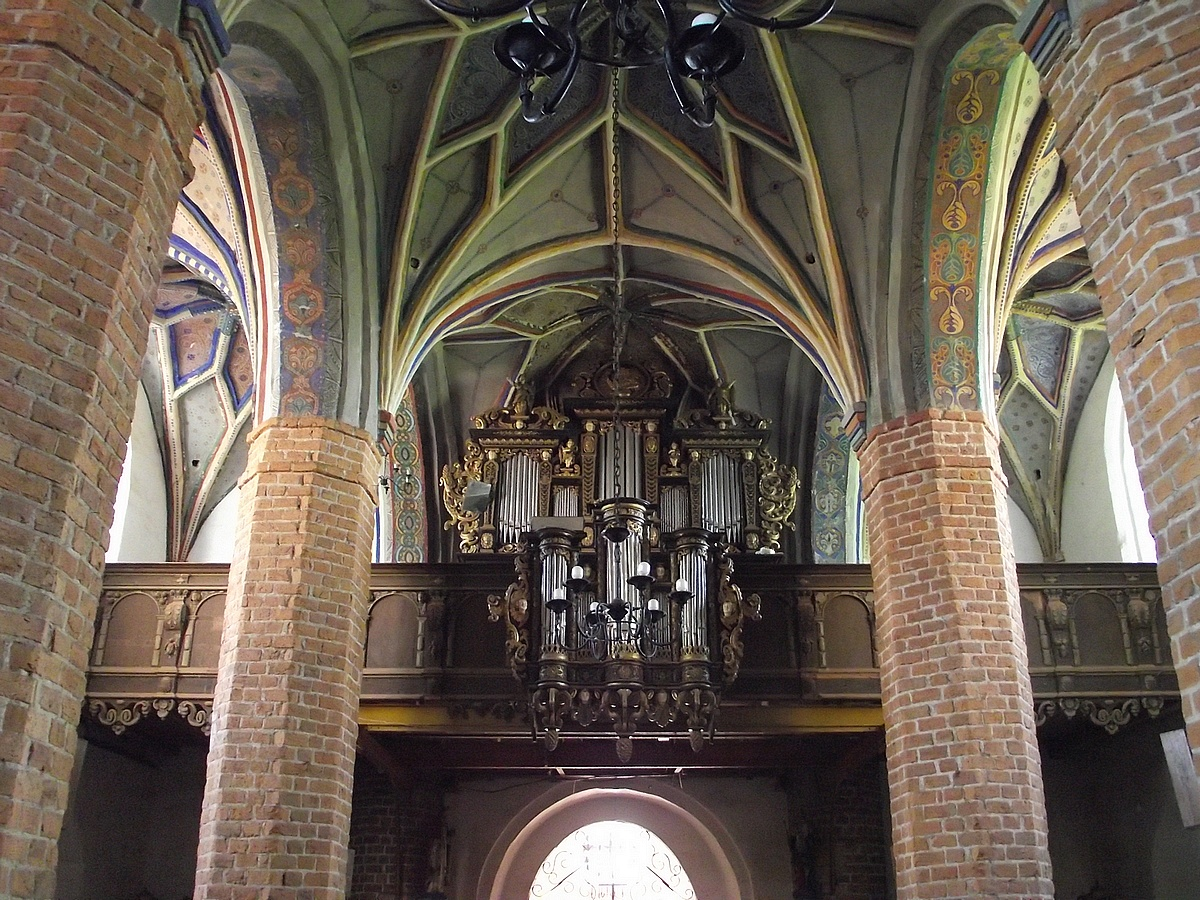
The organ

It is in Tuczno, in the Wałcz County, in West Pomeranian Voivodeship.

It belongs to the Deanery Mirosławiec in the Roman Catholic Diocese of Koszalin-Kołobrzeg.

Formerly the see of the Apostolic Administration of Tütz.

== Construction ==
The church was built 1522. The foundations were expanded after 1640.

== Accidents ==
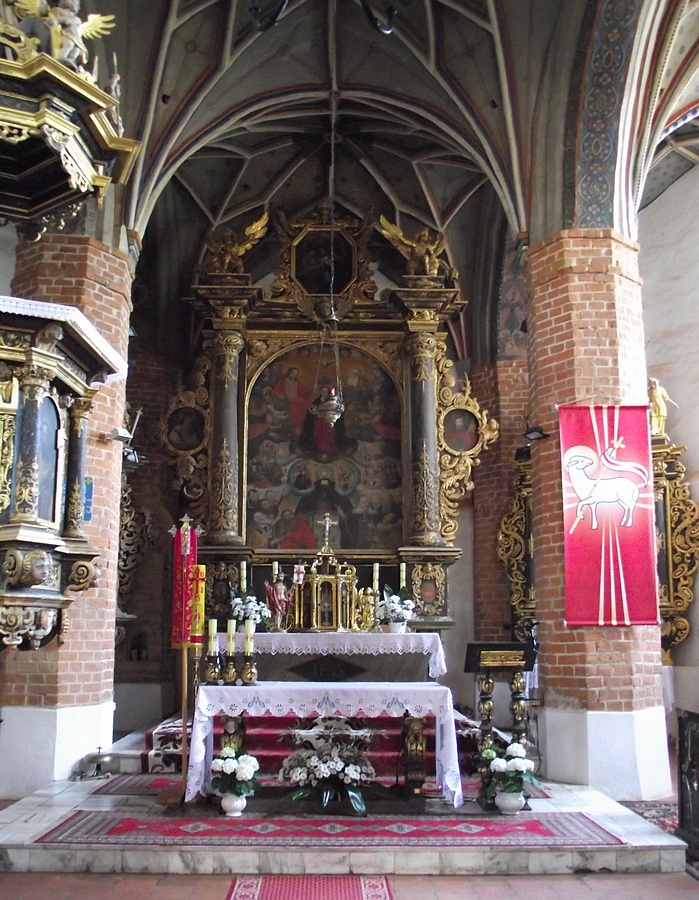
More inside

The tower collapsed in 1636, and there was a fire in 1640.

== History ==
It is a temple built in the style of late Gothic architecture in the year 1522, but was rebuilt many times.

== The inside ==
Inside the church is a starry vault, supported by massive pillars. The main altar has the image of the Coronation of the Blessed Virgin Mary, in the aisle is a Pietà of wood from the beginning of the 16th century. The organ is Baroque and from the mid-17th century. Two bells are from 1923, one from 1911

The baptismal font is made of stone

== External links and references ==
- On the church (in Polish, had translated)
- Another Polish reference
- An English reference
- Some photos
- Google maps
