= Sławno, Lubusz Voivodeship =

Sławno
- Village
- Location within Poland
- Coordinates: 52°50′N 15°31′E
- Country: Poland
- Voivodeship: Lubusz
- County: Strzelce-Drezdenko
- Gmina: Strzelce Krajeńskie
- Population: 210

Sławno [ˈswavnɔ] is a village in the administrative district of Gmina Strzelce Krajeńskie, within Strzelce-Drezdenko County, Lubusz Voivodeship, in western Poland.
