= Ponikiew, West Pomeranian Voivodeship =

Ponikiew
- Village
- Location within Poland
- Coordinates: 53°16′49″N 16°5′23″E
- Country: Poland
- Voivodeship: West Pomeranian
- County: Wałcz
- Gmina: Tuczno
- Population: 70
- Time zone: UTC+1 (CET)
  - Summer (DST): UTC+2 (CEST)
- Area code: +48 67
- Car plates: ZWA

Ponikiew [pɔˈnikʲɛf] (German: Neues Vorwerk) is a village in the administrative district of Gmina Tuczno, within Wałcz County, West Pomeranian Voivodeship, in north-western Poland. It lies approximately 12 km (7 mi) north of Tuczno, 26 km (16 mi) west of Wałcz, and 102 km (63 mi) east of the regional capital Szczecin.

The village has a population of 70.

For the history of the region, see History of Pomerania.
