= Tuczno Castle =

Coordinates: 53°11′26″N 16°09′02″E

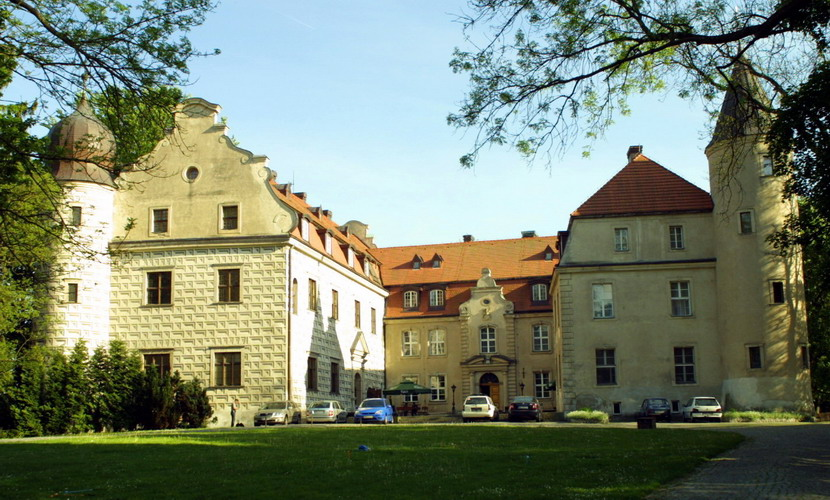
Tuczno Castle

Tuczno Castle (German: Schloss Tütz) is a castle in Tuczno, Wałcz County, West Pomeranian Voivodeship, northwestern Poland.

== History ==
Tuczno Castle was built in 1338. Between 1920 and 1927 Tuczno Castle seated the Apostolic Administration of Tütz, the regional Roman Catholic jurisdiction. It is now refurbished and operates as the Zamek Tuczno Hotel.

== See also ==
- Castles in Poland
