= Tuczno Trzecie =

- Settlement
- Location within Poland
- Coordinates: 53°12′15″N 16°11′22″E
- Country: Poland
- Voivodeship: West Pomeranian
- County: Wałcz
- Gmina: Tuczno
- Population: 20
- Time zone: UTC+1 (CET)
  - Summer (DST): UTC+2 (CEST)
- Area code: +48 67
- Car plates: ZWA

Tuczno Trzecie [ˈtut͡ʂnɔ ˈtʂɛt͡ɕɛ] is a settlement in the administrative district of Gmina Tuczno, within Wałcz County, West Pomeranian Voivodeship, in north-western Poland. It lies approximately 5 km (3 mi) north-east of Tuczno, 20 km (12 mi) west of Wałcz, and 110 km (68 mi) east of the regional capital Szczecin.

The settlement has a population of 20.

For the history of the region, see History of Pomerania.
