= Tuczno Pierwsze =

- Settlement
- Location within Poland
- Coordinates: 53°13′8″N 16°8′55″E
- Country: Poland
- Voivodeship: West Pomeranian
- County: Wałcz
- Gmina: Tuczno
- Population: 20
- Time zone: UTC+1 (CET)
  - Summer (DST): UTC+2 (CEST)
- Area code: +48 67
- Car plates: ZWA

Tuczno Pierwsze [ˈtut͡ʂnɔ ˈpjɛrfʂɛ] is a settlement in the administrative district of Gmina Tuczno, within Wałcz County, West Pomeranian Voivodeship, in north-western Poland. It lies approximately 5 km (3 mi) north of Tuczno, 22 km (14 mi) west of Wałcz, and 107 km (66 mi) east of the regional capital Szczecin.

The settlement has a population of 20.
