= Przyłęg =

- Village
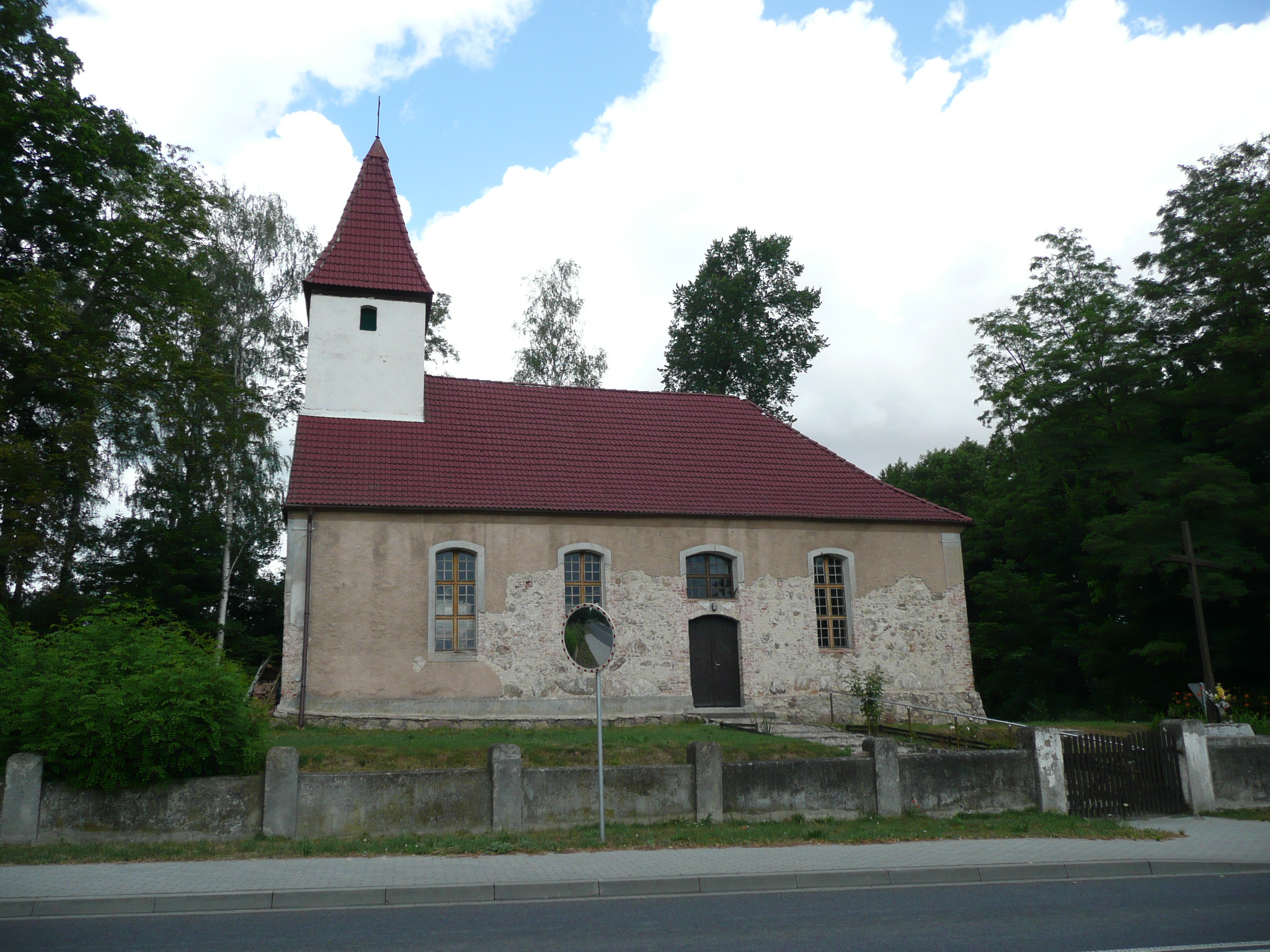
- Catholic church

- Location within Poland
- Coordinates: 52°50′13″N 15°27′49″E
- Country: Poland
- Voivodeship: Lubusz
- County: Strzelce-Drezdenko
- Gmina: Strzelce Krajeńskie

Przyłęg [ˈpʂɨwɛnk] is a village in the administrative district of Gmina Strzelce Krajeńskie, within Strzelce-Drezdenko County, Lubusz Voivodeship, in western Poland.
