= Wielisławice, Lubusz Voivodeship =

Wielisławice
- Village
- Location within Poland
- Coordinates: 52°54′N 15°28′E
- Country: Poland
- Voivodeship: Lubusz
- County: Strzelce-Drezdenko
- Gmina: Strzelce Krajeńskie

Wielisławice [vjɛliswaˈvit͡sɛ] is a village in the administrative district of Gmina Strzelce Krajeńskie, within Strzelce-Drezdenko County, Lubusz Voivodeship, in western Poland.
