= Tuczno, Lubusz Voivodeship =

Tuczno
- Village
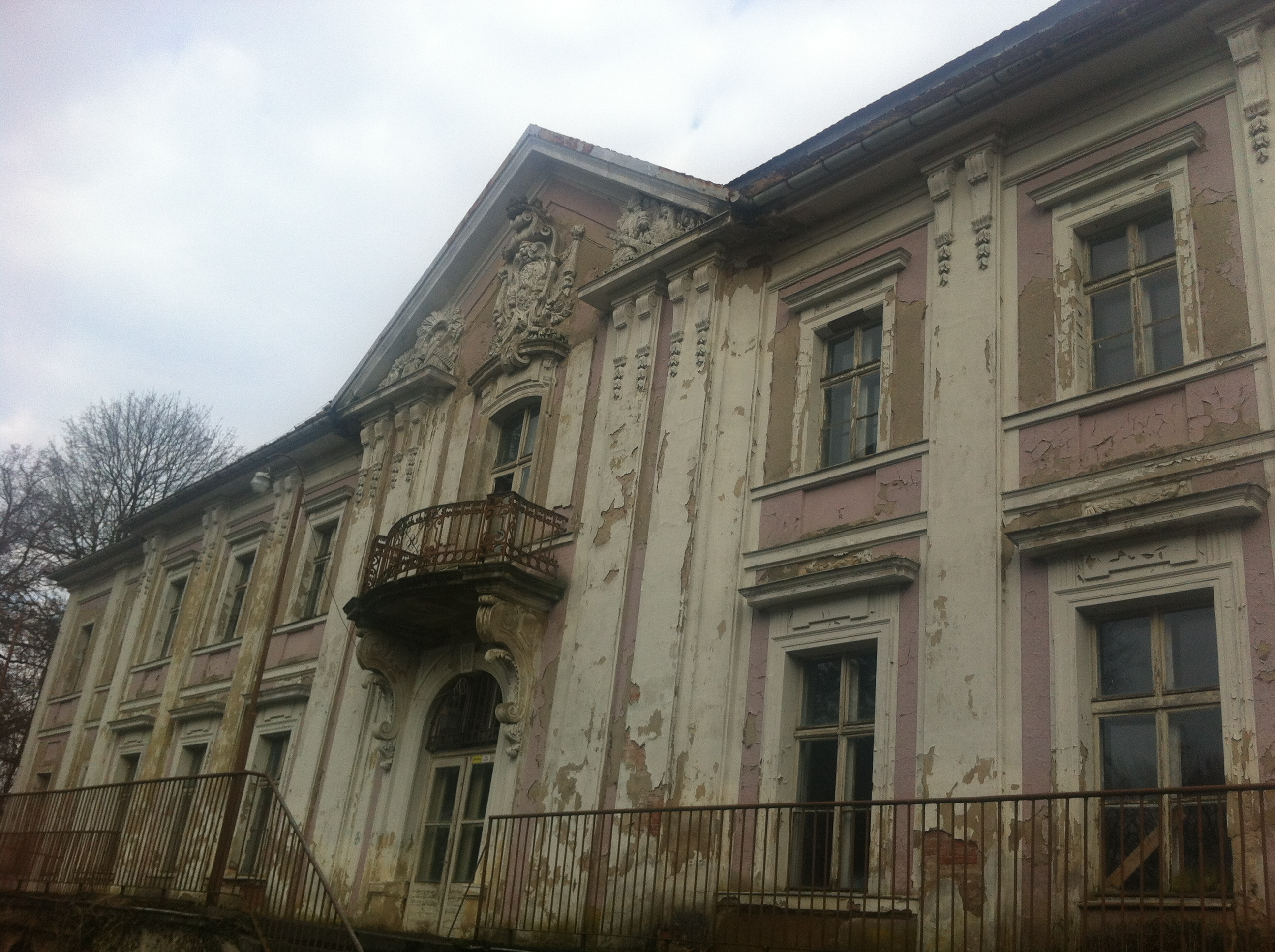
- Palace

- Location within Poland
- Coordinates: 52°58′N 15°29′E
- Country: Poland
- Voivodeship: Lubusz
- County: Strzelce-Drezdenko
- Gmina: Strzelce Krajeńskie
- Population: 710

Tuczno [ˈtut͡ʂnɔ] (German: Schönrade) is a village in the administrative district of Gmina Strzelce Krajeńskie, within Strzelce-Drezdenko County, Lubusz Voivodeship, in western Poland.

The village has a population of 710.

== See also ==
- Tuczno
