= Licheń, Lubusz Voivodeship =

Licheń
- Village
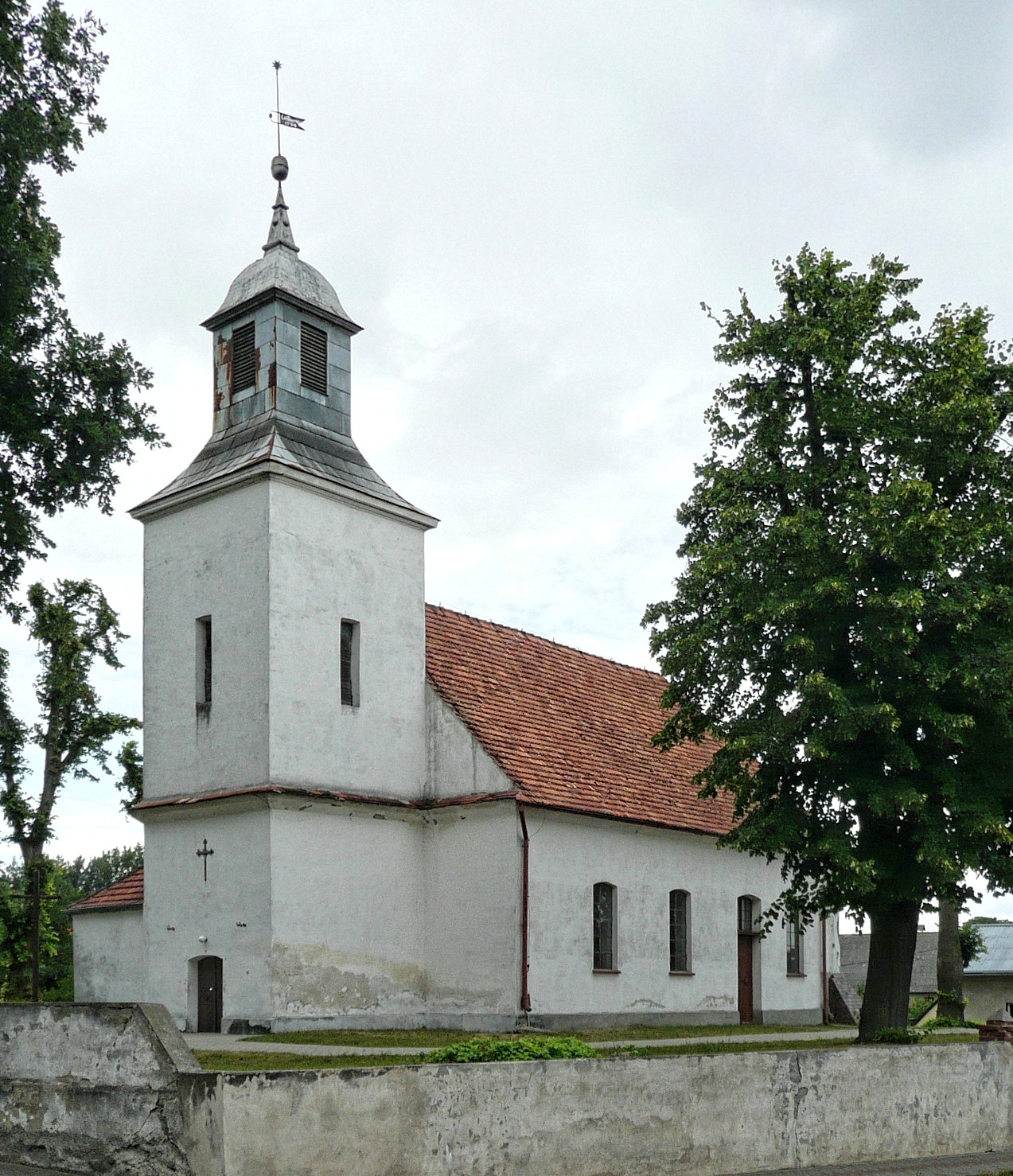
- Immaculate Conception church in Licheń

- Location within Poland
- Coordinates: 52°54′12″N 15°35′49″E
- Country: Poland
- Voivodeship: Lubusz
- County: Strzelce-Drezdenko
- Gmina: Strzelce Krajeńskie
- Time zone: UTC+1 (CET)
  - Summer (DST): UTC+2 (CEST)
- Vehicle registration: FSD

Licheń [ˈlixɛɲ] is a village in the administrative district of Gmina Strzelce Krajeńskie, within Strzelce-Drezdenko County, Lubusz Voivodeship, in western Poland.

== History ==
During World War II, the Germans enslaved Poles as forced labour in the village, and two Polish brothers, aged 23 and 21, were publicly executed by the Gestapo on 23 April 1942.
