= Lipie Góry, Lubusz Voivodeship =

Lipie Góry
- Village
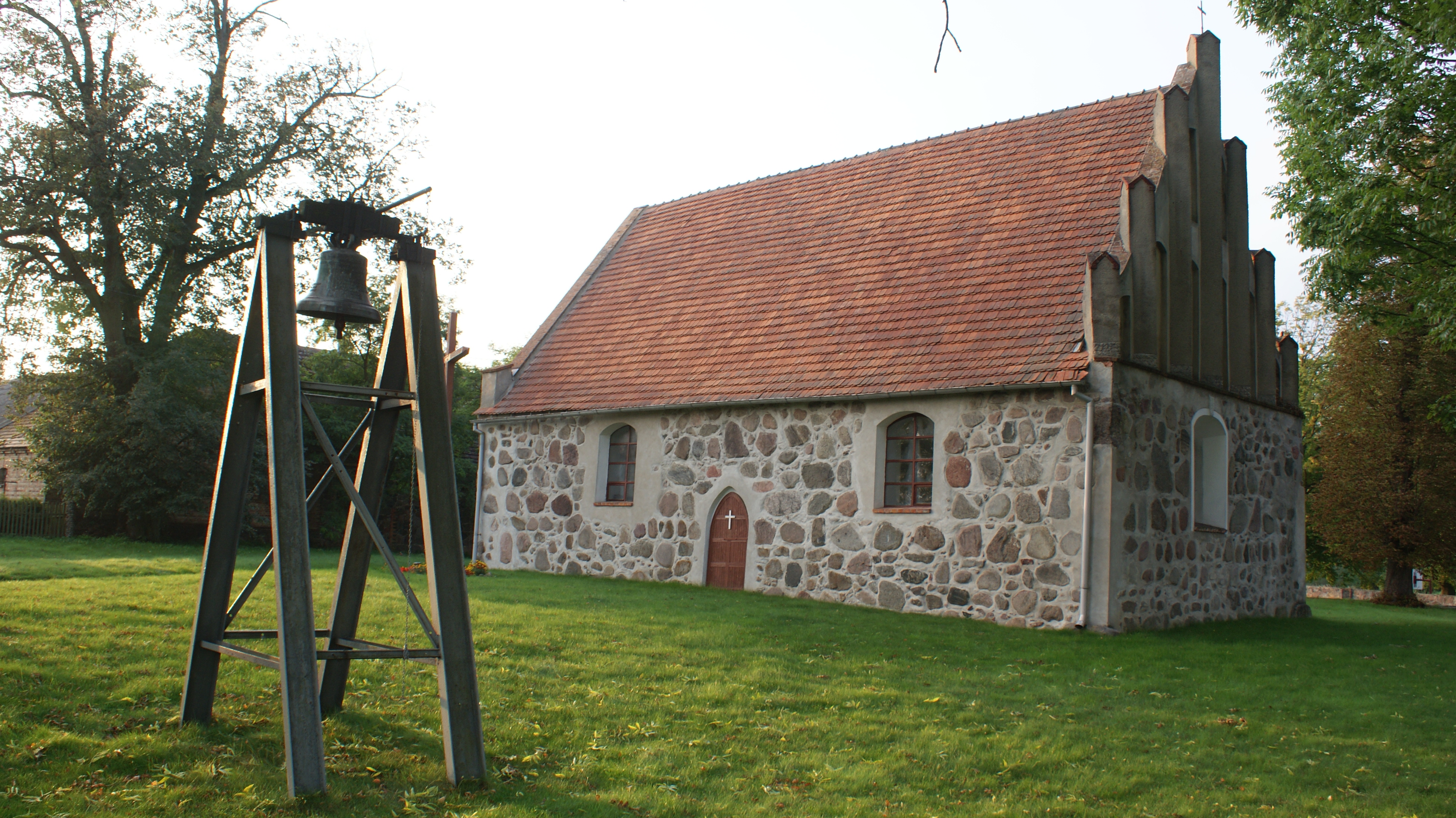
- Catholic church

- Location within Poland
- Coordinates: 52°56′N 15°35′E
- Country: Poland
- Voivodeship: Lubusz
- County: Strzelce-Drezdenko
- Gmina: Strzelce Krajeńskie
- Population: 399

Lipie Góry [ˈlipjɛ ˈɡurɨ] is a village in the administrative district of Gmina Strzelce Krajeńskie, within Strzelce-Drezdenko County, Lubusz Voivodeship, in western Poland.
