= Lodhéřov =

- Municipality
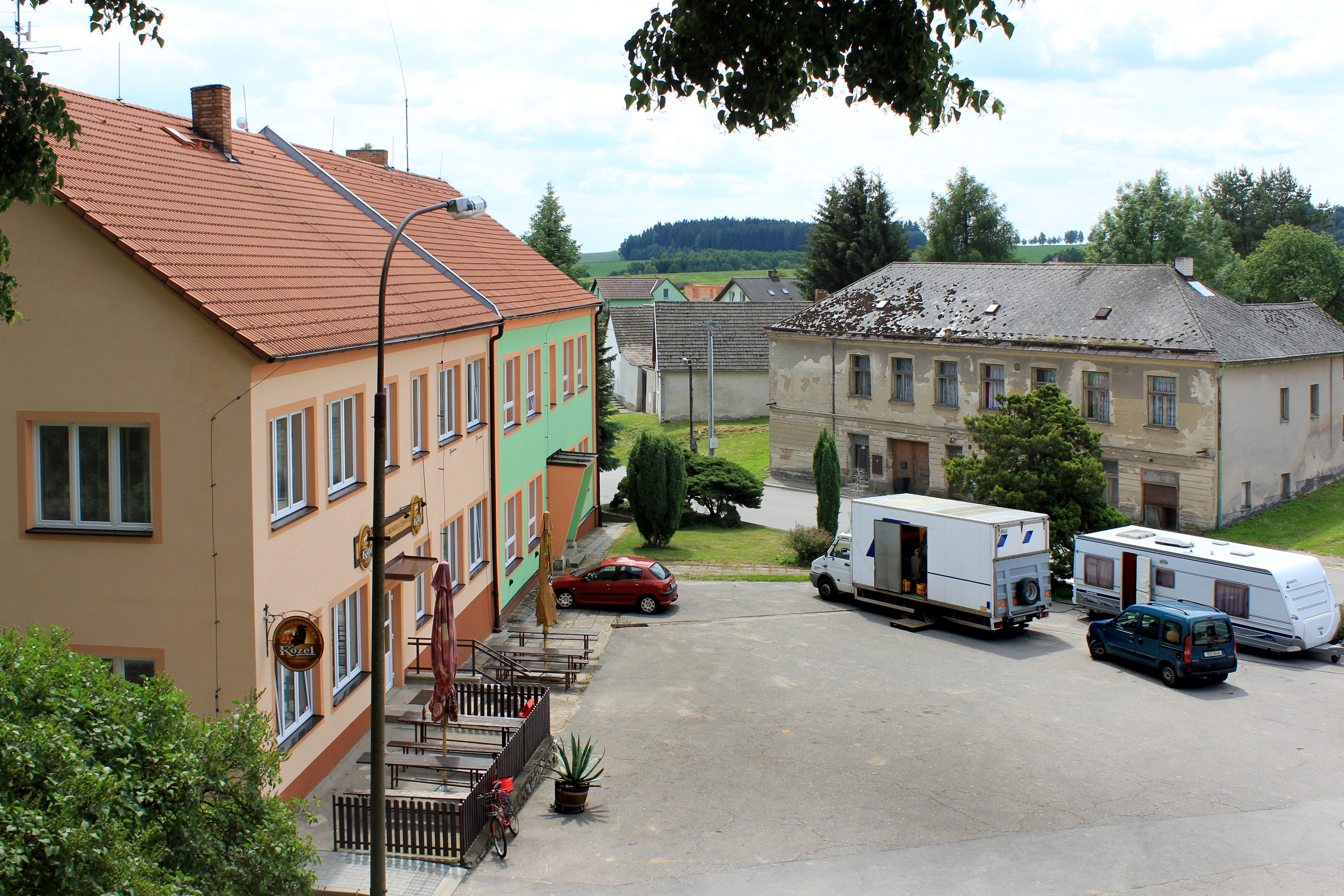
- Centre of Lodhéřov

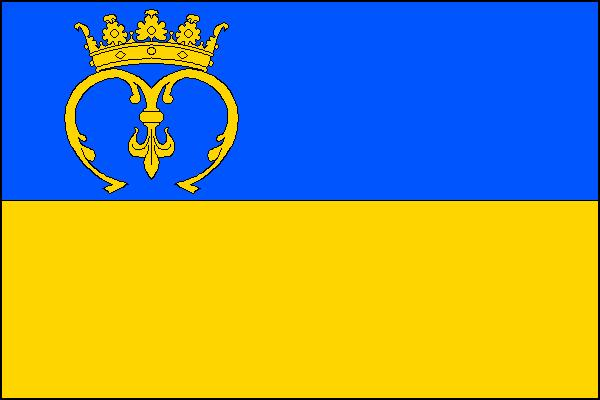
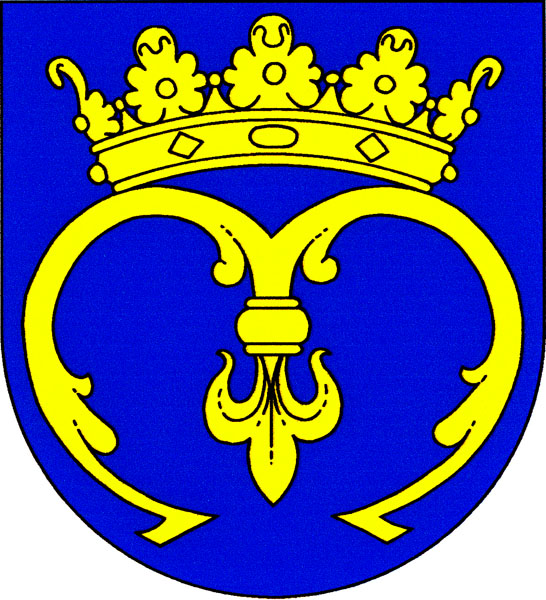
- Flag Coat of arms

- Location in the Czech Republic
- Coordinates: 49°12′55″N 14°57′36″E
- Country: Czech Republic
- Region: South Bohemian
- District: Jindřichův Hradec
- First mentioned: 1294

Area
  - Total: 23.75 km^{2} (9.17 sq mi)
- Elevation: 535 m (1,755 ft)

Population (2026-01-01)
  - Total: 712
  - Density: 30.0/km^{2} (77.6/sq mi)
- Time zone: UTC+1 (CET)
  - Summer (DST): UTC+2 (CEST)
- Postal codes: 377 01, 378 26
- Website: www.lodherov.cz

Lodhéřov (German: Riegerschlag) is a municipality and village in Jindřichův Hradec District in the South Bohemian Region of the Czech Republic. It has about 700 inhabitants.

Lodhéřov lies approximately 9 kilometres (6 mi) north of Jindřichův Hradec, 45 km (28 mi) north-east of České Budějovice, and 104 km (65 mi) south of Prague.

== Administrative division ==
Lodhéřov consists of three municipal parts (in brackets population according to the 2021 census):

- Lodhéřov (419)
- Najdek (22)
- Studnice (202)

== Demographics ==
Historical population
Year	Pop.	±%
1869	1,781	—
1880	1,792	+0.6%
1890	1,745	−2.6%
1900	1,689	−3.2%
1910	1,545	−8.5%
1921	1,415	−8.4%
1930	1,379	−2.5%
1950	889	−35.5%
1961	869	−2.2%
1970	816	−6.1%
1980	640	−21.6%
1991	590	−7.8%
2001	600	+1.7%
2011	623	+3.8%
2021	643	+3.2%
Source: Censuses
