= Studnice (Třebíč District) =

- Municipality
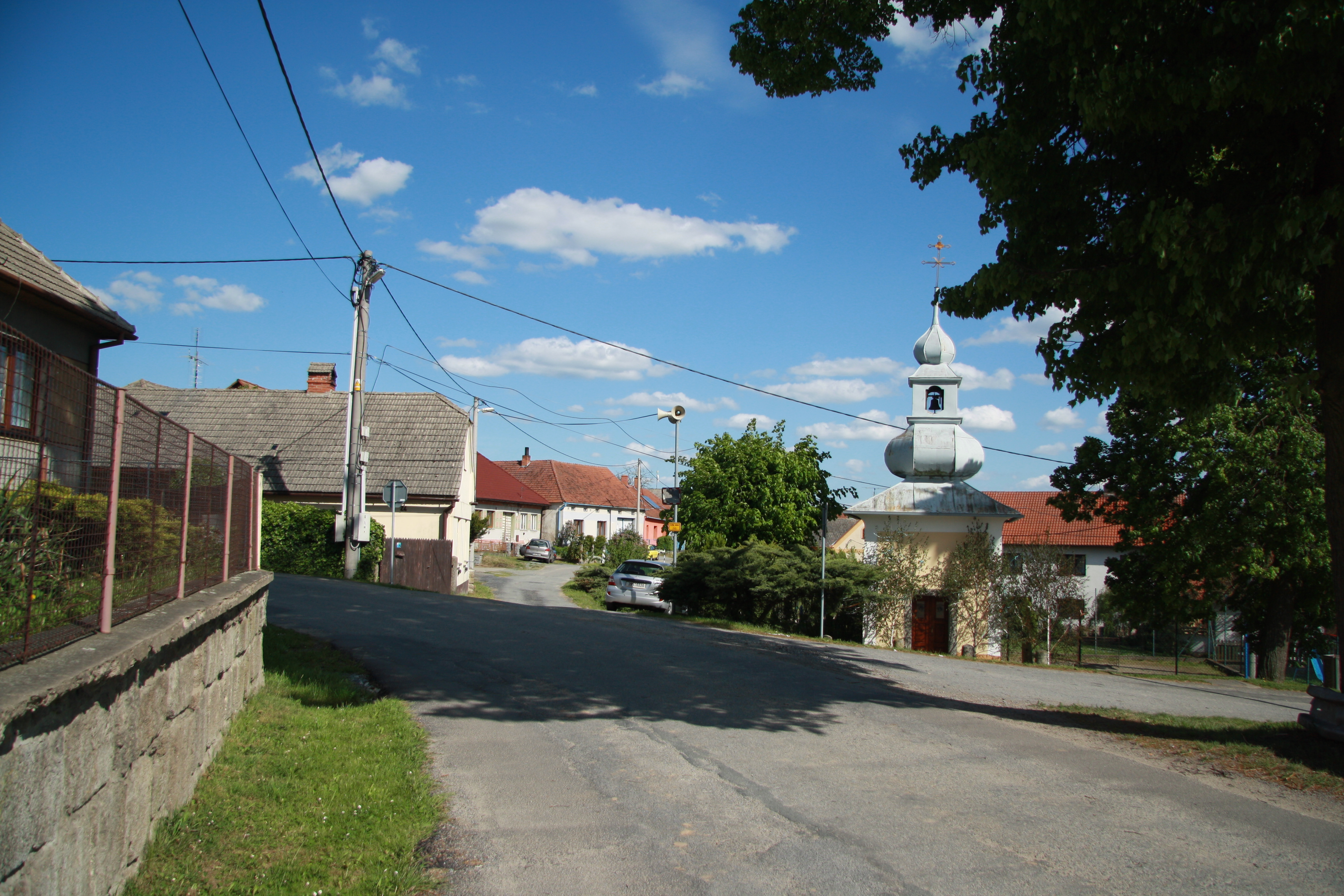
- Centre of Studnice

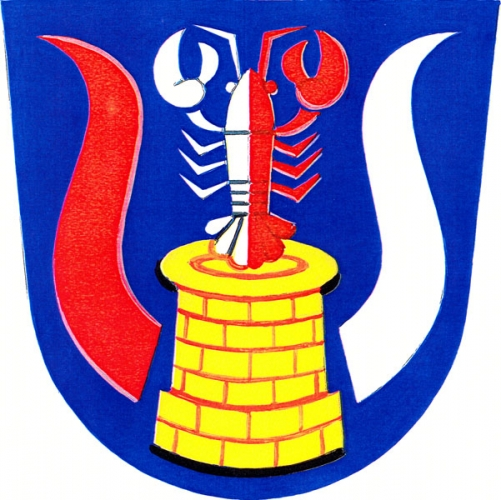
- Flag Coat of arms

- Location in the Czech Republic
- Coordinates: 49°17′28″N 16°1′44″E
- Country: Czech Republic
- Region: Vysočina
- District: Třebíč
- First mentioned: 1366

Area
  - Total: 3.90 km^{2} (1.51 sq mi)
- Elevation: 485 m (1,591 ft)

Population (2026-01-01)
  - Total: 131
  - Density: 33.6/km^{2} (87.0/sq mi)
- Time zone: UTC+1 (CET)
  - Summer (DST): UTC+2 (CEST)
- Postal code: 675 03
- Website: www.studnice-tr.cz

Studnice is a municipality and village in Třebíč District in the Vysočina Region of the Czech Republic. It has about 100 inhabitants.

Studnice lies approximately 14 kilometres (9 mi) north-east of Třebíč, 34 km (21 mi) east of Jihlava, and 146 km (91 mi) south-east of Prague.

== Demographics ==
Historical population
Year	Pop.	±%
1869	136	—
1880	173	+27.2%
1890	183	+5.8%
1900	175	−4.4%
1910	176	+0.6%
1921	177	+0.6%
1930	166	−6.2%
1950	147	−11.4%
1961	154	+4.8%
1970	164	+6.5%
1980	184	+12.2%
1991	148	−19.6%
2001	152	+2.7%
2011	143	−5.9%
2021	133	−7.0%
Source: Censuses
