= Bobrówko, Strzelce-Drezdenko County =

Bobrówko
- Village
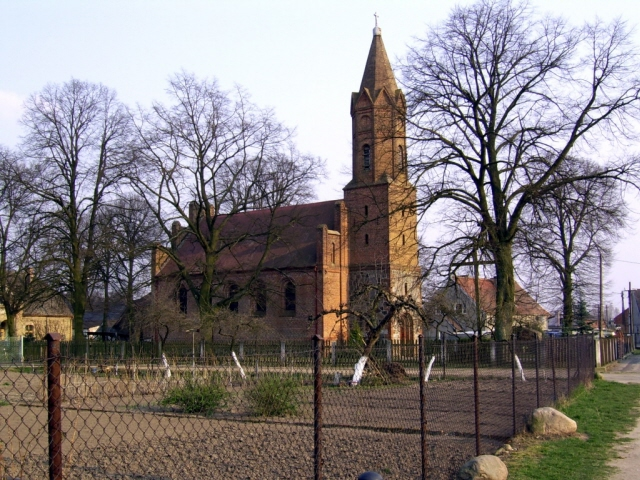
- Catholic church

- Location within Poland
- Coordinates: 52°57′7″N 15°27′13″E
- Country: Poland
- Voivodeship: Lubusz
- County: Strzelce-Drezdenko
- Gmina: Strzelce Krajeńskie

Bobrówko [bɔˈbrufkɔ] is a village in the administrative district of Gmina Strzelce Krajeńskie, within Strzelce-Drezdenko County, Lubusz Voivodeship, in western Poland.
