= Tuczenko =

- Settlement
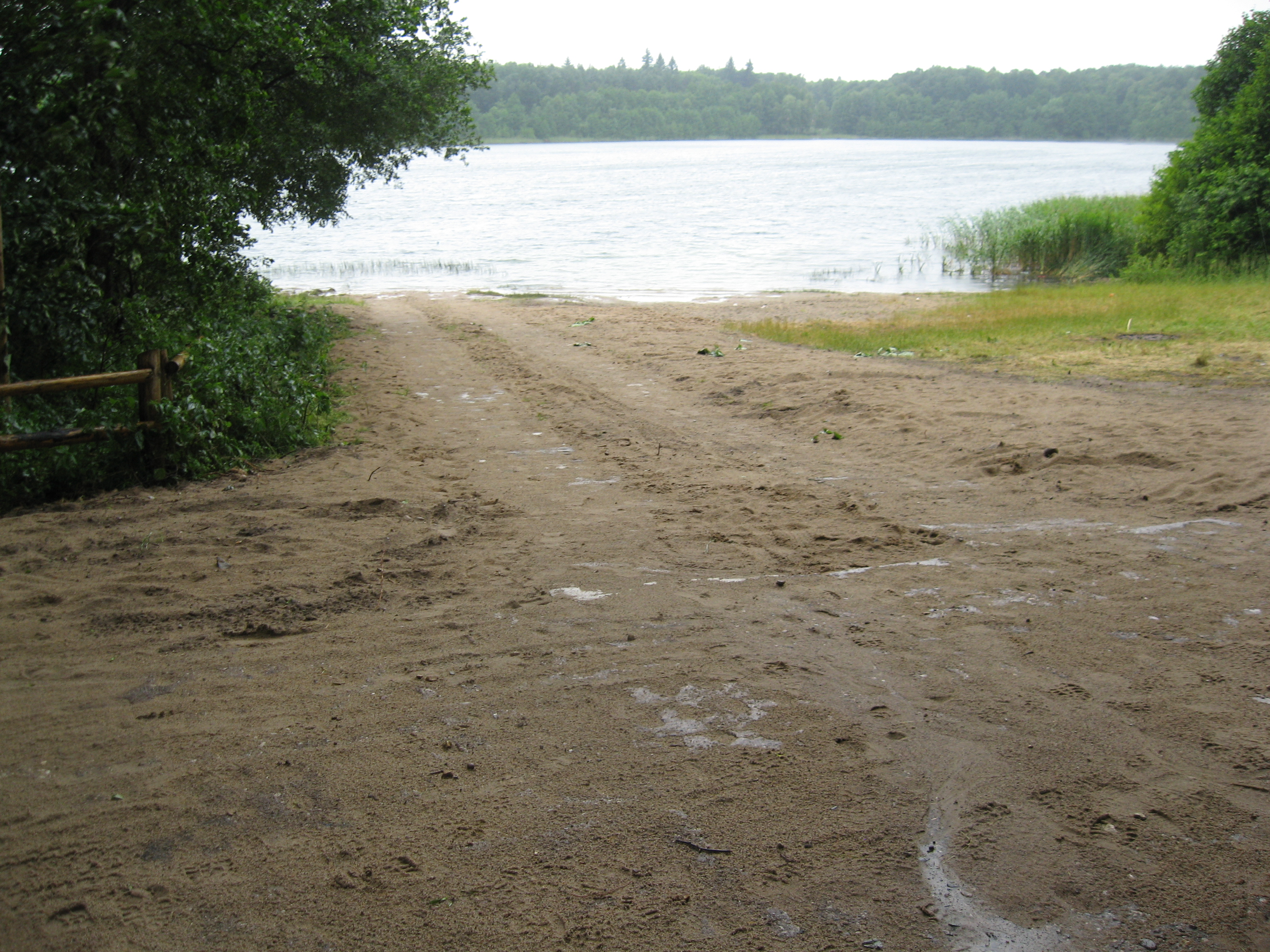

- Location within Poland
- Coordinates: 52°59′16″N 15°27′55″E
- Country: Poland
- Voivodeship: Lubusz
- County: Strzelce-Drezdenko
- Gmina: Strzelce Krajeńskie

Tuczenko [tuˈt͡ʂɛnkɔ] is a settlement in the administrative district of Gmina Strzelce Krajeńskie, within Strzelce-Drezdenko County, Lubusz Voivodeship, in western Poland.
