= Gmina Tuczno =

Gmina Tuczno Tuczno Commune
- Gmina
- Coat of arms
- Interactive map of Gmina Tuczno
- Coordinates (Tuczno): 53°11′N 16°8′E
- Country: Poland
- Voivodeship: West Pomeranian
- County: Wałcz
- Seat: Tuczno

Area
  - Total: 249.90 km^{2} (96.49 sq mi)

Population (2006)
  - Total: 4,925
  - Density: 19.71/km^{2} (51.04/sq mi)
  - Urban: 1,965
  - Rural: 2,960
- Website: http://www.tuczno.pl/

Gmina Tuczno is an urban-rural gmina (administrative district) in Wałcz County, West Pomeranian Voivodeship, in north-western Poland. Its seat is the town of Tuczno, which lies approximately 25 kilometres (16 mi) south-west of Wałcz and 107 km (66 mi) east of the regional capital Szczecin.

The gmina covers an area of 249.90 square kilometres (96.5 sq mi), and as of 2006 its total population is 4,925 for a population density of 19.7 inhabitants per square kilometre (51/sq mi); the population of Tuczno is 1,965, and the population of the rural part of the gmina is 2,960.

== Villages ==
Apart from the town of Tuczno, Gmina Tuczno contains the villages and settlements of Bytyń, Jamienko, Jeziorki, Krępa Krajeńska, Lubiesz, Lubowo, Mączno, Marcinkowice, Martew, Miłogoszcz, Nowa Studnica, Płociczno, Ponikiew, Próchnówko, Rusinowo, Rzeczyca, Strzaliny, Tuczno Drugie, Tuczno Pierwsze, Tuczno Trzecie, Wrzosy, Zdbowo and Złotowo.

== Neighbouring gminas ==
Gmina Tuczno is bordered by the gminas of Człopa, Drawno, Kalisz Pomorski, Mirosławiec and Wałcz.
