= Tuczno =

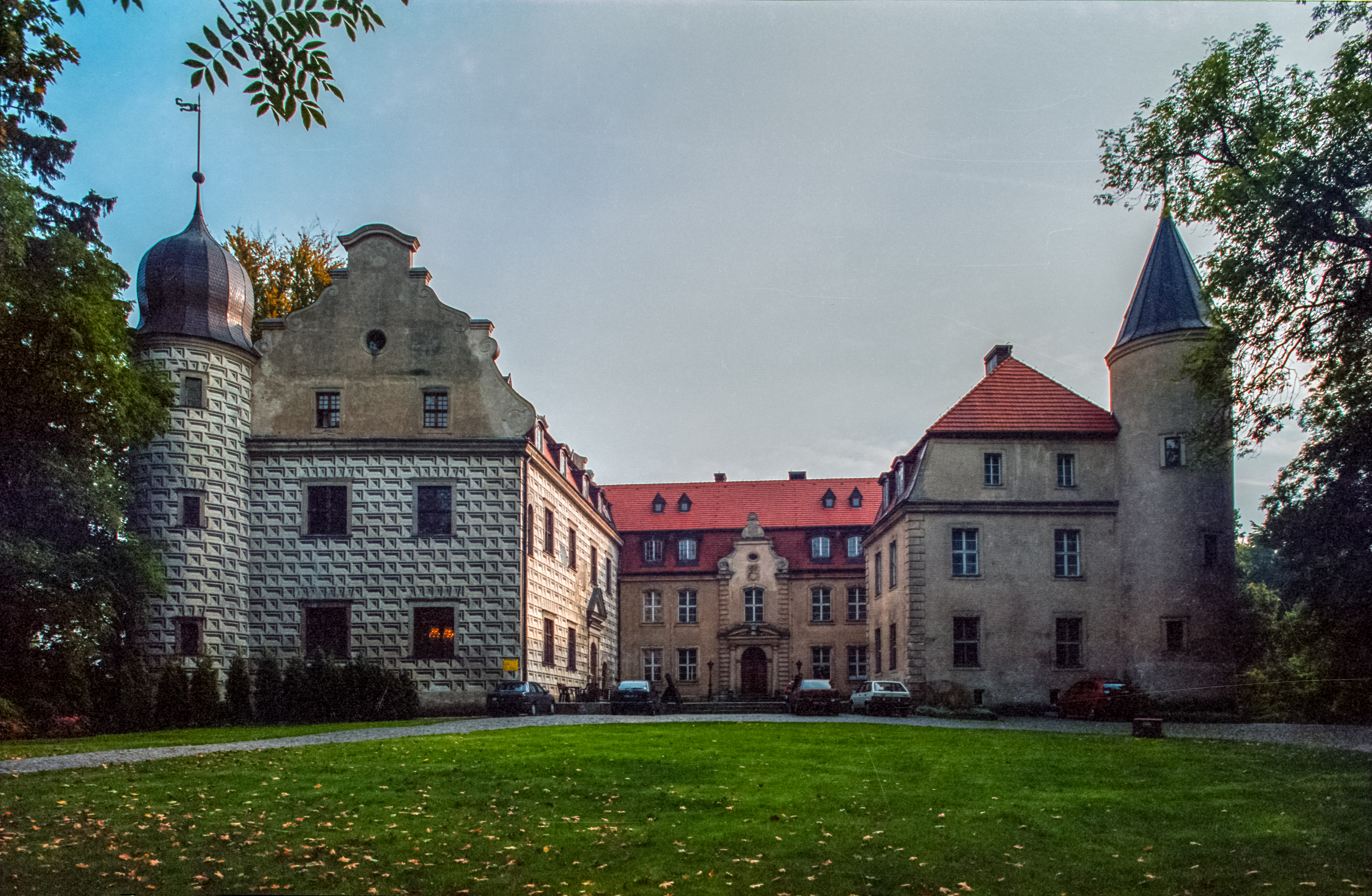
- Tuczno Castle

- Coat of arms

- Location within Poland
- Coordinates: 53°11′N 16°8′E
- Country: Poland
- Voivodeship: West Pomeranian
- County: Wałcz
- Gmina: Tuczno

Area
  - Total: 9.28 km^{2} (3.58 sq mi)

Population (2010)
  - Total: 1,900
  - Density: 200/km^{2} (530/sq mi)
- Time zone: UTC+1 (CET)
  - Summer (DST): UTC+2 (CEST)
- Postal code: 78-640
- Vehicle registration: ZWA
- Website: http://www.tuczno.pl

Tuczno [ˈtut͡ʂnɔ] (German: Tütz, earlier Tietz) is a town and former pre-diocesan Catholic see in Wałcz County, West Pomeranian Voivodeship in northwestern Poland, with 1,900 inhabitants (2010).

It is the home of the restored Tuczno Castle, which is a popular place for conferences.

There is a Michael Jackson Street in Tuczno, the first of its kind in Poland.

== History ==
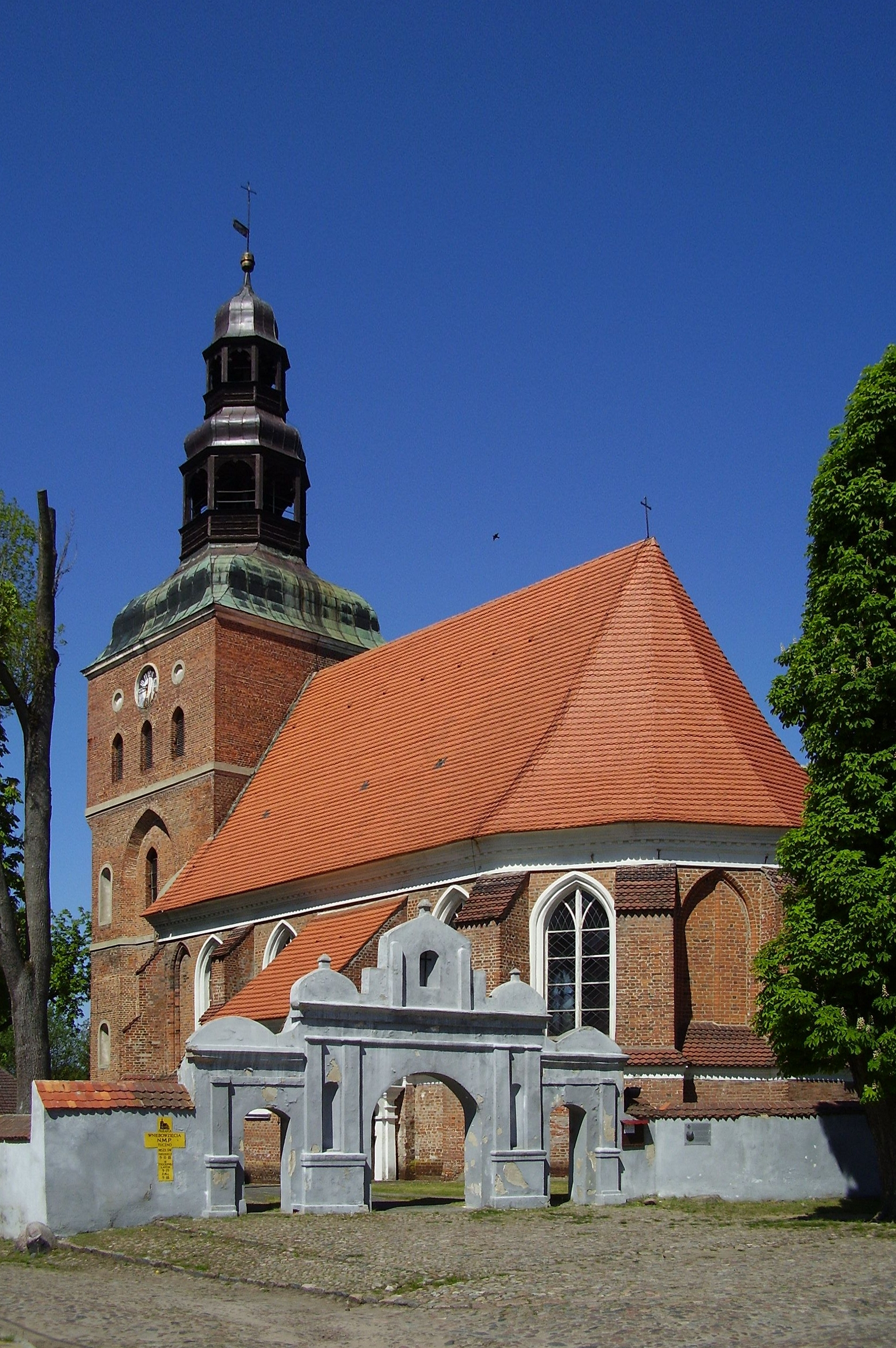
Church of the Assumption of the Blessed Virgin Mary

The first written evidence of Tuczno dates from year 1306. In 1338, Tuczno Castle was erected.

During the Middle Ages the town was variously controlled by Poland, Pomerania, Brandenburg (Neumark) and the State of the Teutonic Order. From 1466 (Second Peace of Thorn), when it was ceded by the Teutonic Order, Tuczno became definitively part of the Polish Poznań Voivodeship. From 1569 it was part of the Greater Poland Province of the Crown of the Kingdom of Poland within the Polish-Lithuanian Commonwealth.

In 1772 it was annexed by Prussia in the First Partition of Poland, becoming part of the Netze District, then the Province of West Prussia (Province of Prussia 1829–1878, then West Prussia again). In 1871 Prussia became part of the German Empire. After World War I it was part of the rump of West Prussia which remained with Weimar Germany – Posen-West Prussia – and was incorporated into the Province of Pomerania by the Nazis in 1938. It became part of Poland again in 1945 as part of the Recovered Territories.

== Landmarks ==
- Tuczno Castle
- Church of the Assumption of the Blessed Virgin Mary

== Demographics ==
Historical population

Year	Pop.	±%
1871	1,895	—
1880	2,045	+7.9%
1890	2,229	+9.0%
1900	2,113	−5.2%
1910	2,096	−0.8%
1925	2,132	+1.7%

Year	Pop.	±%
1950	1,366	−35.9%
1960	1,799	+31.7%
1978	1,883	+4.7%
1988	1,943	+3.2%
2010	1,900	−2.2%

== Ecclesiastical History ==
In 1923.05.01 was established the permanent Apostolic Administration of Tütz (German; Tuczno in Polish) on canonical territories split off from the Metropolitan Archdiocese of Gniezno and Diocese of Chełmno, but when the Apostolic Administration (exempt) was promoted on 1930.08.13, it was also renamed after its new see, as Territorial Prelature of Schneidemühl (German; in 1945 renamed in Polish Piła).
