= Landkreis Friedeberg Nm. =

Former administrative division

- District of Prussia
- 1816–1945
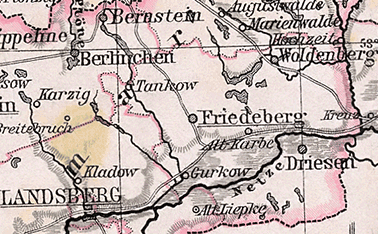
- Map from 1905
- Capital: Friedeberg (Strzelce Krajeńskie)
- History
  - Established: 1816
  - Disestablished: 1945
- Today part of: Poland

The district of Friedeberg Nm., also called Friedeberger Kreis in the 19th century, was an administrative district from 1816 to 1945, located within the Province of Brandenburg of Prussia and Germany until 1938 and then to the Province of Pomerania. The district comprised the three towns of Driesen (Drezdenko), Friedeberg (Strzelce Krajeńskie) and Woldenberg (Dobiegniew). The district area is now in the Strzelce-Drezdenko County of the Polish Lubusz Voivodeship.

== History ==
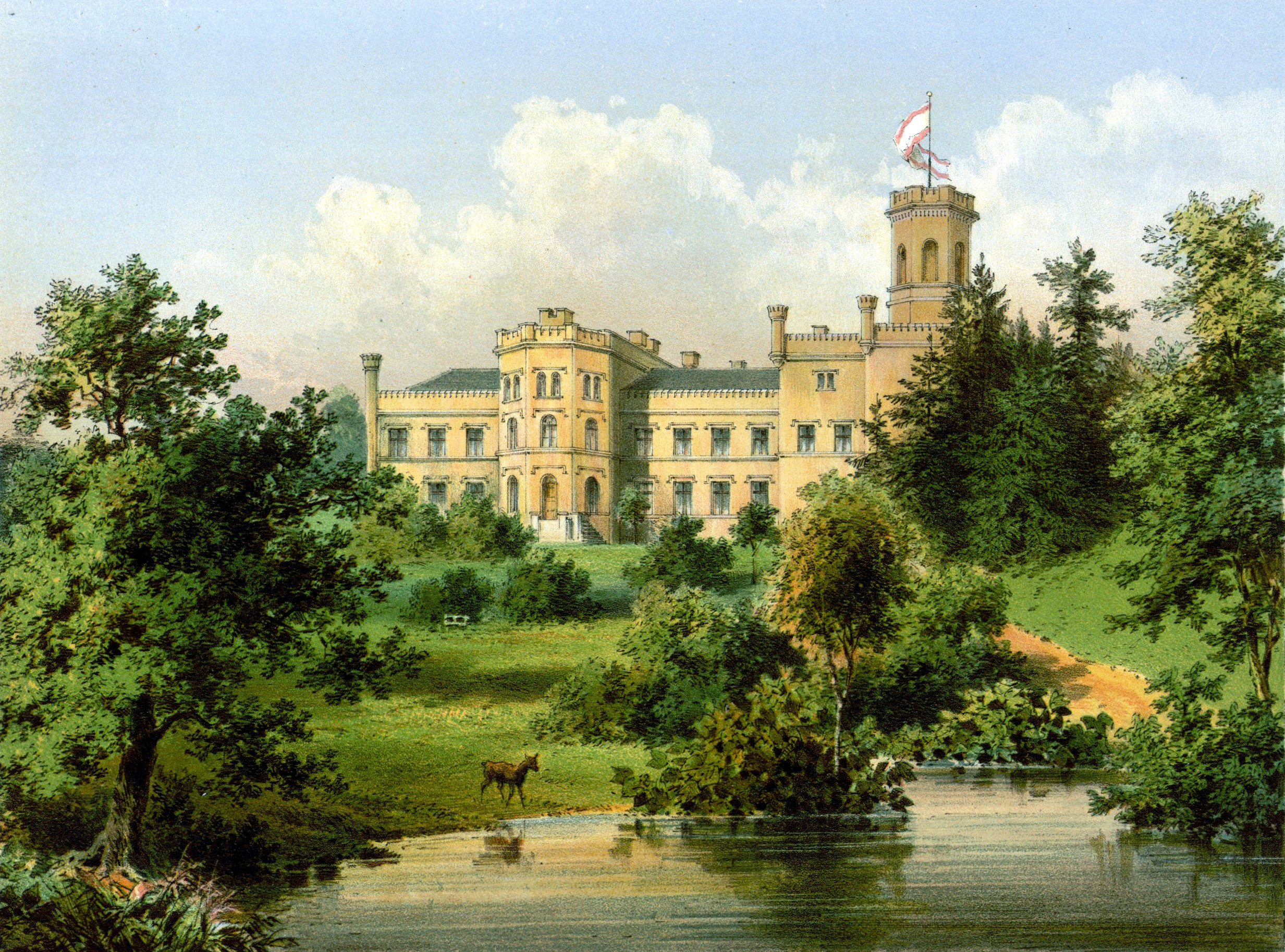
Mehrenthin (Mierzęcin) manor around 1860, Alexander Duncker collection

The territory formed part of medieval Piast-ruled Poland and its provincial Duchy of Greater Poland, before the annexation of the area by the Margraviate of Brandenburg. In the late medieval period, the Margraviate of Brandenburg was divided into districts known as Kreise. One of these historical districts was the Friedeberger Kreis or the Friedeberg district, which formed one of the four so-called Hinterkreise in the Neumark.

As part of the establishment of provinces and administrative regions in Prussia, Regierungsbezirk Frankfurt was established in the Province of Brandenburg in 1815, which included the Friedeberg district which had its capital at Friedeberg in der Neumark (Strzelce Krajeńskie), abbreviated as Friedeberg Nm. One of the main escape routes for insurgents of the unsuccessful Polish November Uprising from partitioned Poland to the Great Emigration led through the district.

Since January 1871, the district belonged to the German Reich. On October 1, 1938, the Friedeberg Nm. district was reclassified to the Province of Pomerania and became part of the administrative region Grenzmark Posen-West Prussia.

During World War II, Germany operated the Oflag II-C prisoner-of-war camp for Polish officers and a forced labour subcamp of the Stalag II-D POW camp in the district. Thousands of Poles and some other nationals were subjected to forced labour in the district. The Poles were forced to wear "P" badges and were treated as "subhumans". In 1941–1942, the Gestapo carried out public executions of Poles in various locations in the district, as part of the Sonderbehandlung campaign to terrorize the Poles.

In the spring of 1945, the district was occupied by the Red Army. After the end of the war, the district was placed under Polish administration by the Soviet Union. The local German population was expelled in accordance with the Potsdam Agreement.

== Railways ==
The Friedeberg district had already been connected to the railway network by the Arnswalde-Kreuz section of the Stargard-Posen Railway Company since 1848. In the following decade, from 1857, the Prussian Eastern Railway, which connected Berlin with East Prussia, crossed the district parallel to the Noteć river. However, the Friedeberg station was 7 km away from the town, and therefore a small railway was built to the town in 1897.

In order to bypass the areas that were restored to Poland after 1919, the Deutsche Reichsbahn built the branch line Altbeelitz-Schwerin (Warthe) in 1936.

== Municipalities ==
In 1945, the district of Friedeberg Nm. contained the following towns and municipalities:

- Aarhorst
- Alt Beelitz
- Alt Gurkowschbruch
- Altfließ
- Altkarbe
- Birkbruch
- Birkholz
- Blumenfelde
- Brand
- Brandsheide
- Braunsfelde
- Breitenstein
- Breitenwerder
- Brenkenhofsbruch
- Brenkenhofswalde
- Buchwerder
- Büssow
- Dolgen
- Dragebruch
- Driesen, town
- Erbenswunsch
- Eschbruch
- Falkenstein
- Franzthal
- Friedeberg Nm., town
- Friedebergschbruch
- Friedrichsdorf
- Geilenfelde
- Gottschimm
- Gottschimmerbruch
- Gurkow
- Guscht
- Guschterbruch
- Guschterholländer
- Haferwiese
- Hammer
- Hermsdorf
- Hohenkarzig
- Lauchstädt
- Lichtenow
- Liependorf
- Lubiath
- Machern
- Mansfelde
- Marienthal
- Mehrenthin
- Modderwiese
- Mückenburg
- Netzbruch
- Neu Anspach
- Neu Dessau
- Neu Erbach
- Neu Mecklenburg
- Neu Ulm
- Neukarbe
- Neuteich
- Pehlitz
- Rohrsdorf
- Salzkossäthen
- Schlanow
- Schönfeld
- Schönrade
- Schüttenburg
- Seegenfelde
- Steinhöfel
- Tankow
- Trebitsch
- Vorbruch
- Vordamm
- Wildenow
- Woldenberg Nm., town
- Wolgast
- Wugarten
- Wutzig
