= Trzebicz =

Trzebicz may refer to:

- Trzebicz, Lubusz Voivodeship
- Trzebicz, West Pomeranian Voivodeship
- Trzebicz-Młyn
- Trzebicz Nowy

== See also ==
- Třebíč
- Trebitsch
- Trzebież
