= Lubiewo =

Lubiewo may refer to the following places:

- Lubiewo, a district of Międzyzdroje (north-west Poland)
- Lubiewo, Kuyavian-Pomeranian Voivodeship (north-central Poland)
- Lubiewo, Lubusz Voivodeship (west Poland)
- Lubiewo, Warmian-Masurian Voivodeship (north Poland)

There is also a Polish gay novel by Michał Witkowski named Lubiewo
