= Rapin =

Rapin may refer to:

- Claude Rapin (born 19??), an archaeologist specialising in Central Asian studies
- Daniel Rapin (1799–1882), a Swiss botanist
- Henri Rapin (1873-1939), a French painter, illustrator and interior designer
- Nicolas Rapin (1535–1608), a French magistrate, royal officer, translator, poet and satirist
- René Rapin (1621–1687), a French Jesuit and writer
- Paul de Rapin (1661–1725), a French historian writing under English patronage
- Rąpin, a village in Poland
