= Gmina Drezdenko =

Gmina Drezdenko Drezdenko Commune
- Gmina
- Flag Coat of arms
- Interactive map of Gmina Drezdenko
- Coordinates (Drezdenko): 52°50′N 15°50′E
- Country: Poland
- Voivodeship: Lubusz
- County: Strzelce-Drezdenko
- Seat: Drezdenko

Area
  - Total: 399.9 km^{2} (154.4 sq mi)

Population (2019-06-30)
  - Total: 17,166
  - Density: 42.93/km^{2} (111.2/sq mi)
  - Urban: 10,122
  - Rural: 7,044
- Website: https://www.drezdenko.pl

Gmina Drezdenko is an urban-rural gmina (administrative district) in Strzelce-Drezdenko County, Lubusz Voivodeship, in western Poland. Its seat is the town of Drezdenko, which lies approximately 21 kilometres (13 mi) east of Strzelce Krajeńskie and 41 km (25 mi) east of Gorzów Wielkopolski.

The gmina covers an area of 399.9 square kilometres (154.4 sq mi), and as of 2019 its total population is 17,166.

== Villages ==
Apart from the town of Drezdenko, Gmina Drezdenko contains the villages and settlements of Bagniewo, Czartowo, Drawiny, Duraczewo, Górzyska, Gościm, Goszczanowiec, Goszczanówko, Goszczanowo, Grotów, Hutniki, Jeleń, Karwin, Kijów, Klesno, Kosin, Lipno, Lipowo, Lubiatów, Lubiewo, Marzenin, Modropole, Niegosław, Osów, Przeborowo, Rąpin, Stare Bielice, Trzebicz, Trzebicz Nowy, Trzebicz-Młyn, Tuczępy, Zagórze and Zielątkowo.

== Neighbouring gminas ==
Gmina Drezdenko is bordered by the gminas of Dobiegniew, Drawsko, Krzyż Wielkopolski, Międzychód, Santok, Sieraków, Skwierzyna, Stare Kurowo and Zwierzyn.

== Twin towns – sister cities ==
Gmina Drezdenko is twinned with:

- Winsen, Germany
