= Kijów =

Kijów may refer to:

- Polish name for Kyiv, the capital of Ukraine
- Kijów, Silesian Voivodeship (south Poland)
- Kijów, Lubusz Voivodeship (west Poland)
- Kijów, Opole Voivodeship (south-west Poland)
