= Hans Kmoch =

Austrian-Dutch-American chess master, arbiter, chess journalist and author

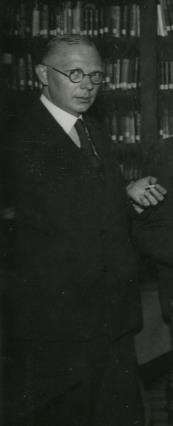
- Kmoch in 1935

Personal information
- Full name: Johann Joseph Kmoch
- Born: July 25, 1894 Vienna
- Died: February 13, 1973 (aged 78) New York City

Chess career
- Country: Austria; Netherlands (1930s); United States (1947–1973)
- Title: International Master (1950); International Arbiter (1951)

Johann "Hans" Joseph Kmoch (July 25, 1894 – February 13, 1973) was an Austrian-Dutch-American chess International Master (1950), International Arbiter (1951), and a chess journalist and author, for which he is best known.

== Playing career ==
Kmoch had most of his best competitive results between 1925 and 1931. He won at Debrecen 1925 with 10/13 over a field which had 12 of the world's top 56 players, a Chessmetrics performance rating of 2696. At Budapest 1926, he shared 3rd–5th places with 9/15 behind winners Ernst Grünfeld and Mario Monticelli. Kmoch shared 2nd–3rd places at Kecskemét 1927 with 6/9 behind the winner, World Chess Champion Alexander Alekhine. At Vienna 1928, Kmoch placed 6th with 8/13 as Richard Réti won. Then at the Trebitsch Memorial, Vienna 1928, Kmoch shared 3rd–6th places with 6/10, half a point behind Gruenfeld and Sándor Takács. At Brno 1928, Kmoch placed 3rd with 6/9, with Réti and Friedrich Sämisch winning. Kmoch won at Ebensee 1930 with 6/7, ahead of Erich Eliskases.

Kmoch represented Austria three times at the Chess Olympiads. At London 1927, he played board three and scored 6½/12 (+4−3=5); at Hamburg 1930, he was on board one, and scored 8/14 (+6−4=4), as Austria placed fourth; then at Prague 1931, Kmoch was on board three and scored 9/15 (+4−1=10). Overall, he scored 23½/41 (+14−8=19), for 57.3%.

His last good tournament result was 2nd at Baarn 1941 with 5½/7, behind Max Euwe. Kmoch stopped playing competitively after this tournament to focus on chess writing and management of chess events.

== Writing career ==
Kmoch had written for the magazine Wiener Schachzeitung from the early 1920s. His Die Kunst der Verteidigung (The Art of Defence) was the first chess book devoted to this subject. In 1930, Kmoch updated the Bilguier openings handbook, and wrote the tournament book for the Carlsbad 1929 event.

In 1929 and 1934, Kmoch served as Alexander Alekhine's second in his world championship matches against Efim Bogoljubow. Kmoch and his Jewish wife Trudy lived in the Netherlands from 1932 to 1947. Kmoch also served as Alekhine's second in the 1935 title match against Max Euwe, and he wrote a book on the match. In 1941, he wrote a book on the best games of Akiba Rubinstein.

After World War II ended, Kmoch and his wife moved to the United States, settling in New York City. Kmoch served as the Secretary and manager of the Manhattan Chess Club, and directed tournaments. He also wrote for Chess Review, then one of the leading American chess magazines. It was he who dubbed a young Bobby Fischer's 1956 victory over Donald Byrne in the Third Rosenwald Tournament the "Game of the Century" in the December 1956 issue.

In 1956, he wrote his most famous book, Pawn Power in Chess (German: Die Kunst der Bauernführung), which is notorious for its use of neologisms ("ram", "lever", "sweeper", "sealer", "quartgrip", "monochromy", etc.).

=== Books ===
- Pawn Power in Chess (1959, David McKay Company), Revised 1990 Edition, Dover Publications, ISBN 978-0486264868
- Bled 1931 • International Chess Tournament, 1987, Caissa Editions, ISBN 978-0939433032
- Rubinstein's Chess Masterpieces: 100 Selected Games, 1960, Dover Publications, ISBN 978-0486206172
- The Leningrad Master Tournament 1934: with participation of Max Euwe and Hans Kmoch, Kmoch and multiple co-authors, 2021, independently pub., ISBN 979-8714484865
- New York 1948–49 International Chess Tournament, 1950, Albert S. Pinkus pub., ASIN B000LO84YY
- Die Kunst der Verteidigung (The Art of Defense), 1982, German 4th Edition, De Gruyter pub., ISBN 978-3110089080
- Die Kunst der Bauernführung: Ein Beitrag zur Schachstrategie (The Art of Pawn Management: A Contribution to Chess Strategy), 1956, German Edition, Siegfried Englehardt Verlag, ASIN B000V2O8YQ
- Nachtrag Zu P. R. V. Bilguer (V.D. Lasa) Handbuch Des Schachspiels Fur Die Jahre 1916–1929, 1930, Walter De Gruyter pub., ASIN B004BHFBSO
- Max Euwe • Meister Des Kampfschachs, 1938, German Reprint Edition, De Gruyter pub., ISBN 978-3112411919
- Rubinstein Gewinnt! • Hundert Glanzpartien des grossen Schachkunstlers (Rubinstein Wins! • One hundred brilliant games by the great chess artist), 2021, German Edition, Ishi Press, ISBN 978-4871875806
- World Chessmasters in Battle Royal, co-author I.A. Horowitz, 1949, Chess Review; dist. by D. McKay Co., ASIN B0007E3A88
- Staunton • Turnier Groningen, co-author Max Euwe, 1948, Verlag Schweizer Schachbücherei, ASIN B000V2QCAE
- Groningen 1946 International Chess Tournament, co-author Max Euwe, 2020, Ishi Press, ISBN 978-4871879989

== Legacy ==
Several openings lines are named after Kmoch.

- Kmoch Variation in the Queen's Gambit Declined: 1.d4 d5 2.c4 e6 3.Nc3 Nf6 4.Nf3 c5 (the Semi-Tarrasch Variation) 5.cxd5 Nxd5 6.e4 Nxc3 7.bxc3 cxd4 8.cxd4 Bb4+ 9.Bd2 Bxd2+ 10.Qxd2 0-0 11.Bb5.
- Kmoch Variation (the Noa Variation, also called the Capablanca Variation) in the Nimzo-Indian Defense: 1.d4 Nf6 2.c4 e6 3.Nc3 Bb4 4.Qc2 (the Classical Variation) d5.
- Kmoch Variation in the Nimzo-Indian Defense: 1.d4 Nf6 2.c4 e6 3.Nc3 Bb4 4.f3.
- Kmoch Variation in the Philidor Defense: 1.e4 e5 2.Nf3 d6 3.d4 Nd7 4.Bc4 c6 5.Ng5.
- Kmoch Variation (sometimes called the Capablanca Variation) in Alekhine's Defense: 1.e4 Nf6 2.e5 Nd5 3.Bc4 Nb6 4.Bb3 c5 5.d3.
