= Jeleń, Lubusz Voivodeship =

Jeleń
- Settlement
- Location within Poland
- Coordinates: 52°43′52″N 15°51′24″E
- Country: Poland
- Voivodeship: Lubusz
- County: Strzelce-Drezdenko
- Gmina: Drezdenko

Jeleń [ˈjɛlɛɲ] is a settlement in the administrative district of Gmina Drezdenko, within Strzelce-Drezdenko County, Lubusz Voivodeship, in western Poland.
