= Marzenin, Lubusz Voivodeship =

Marzenin
- Village
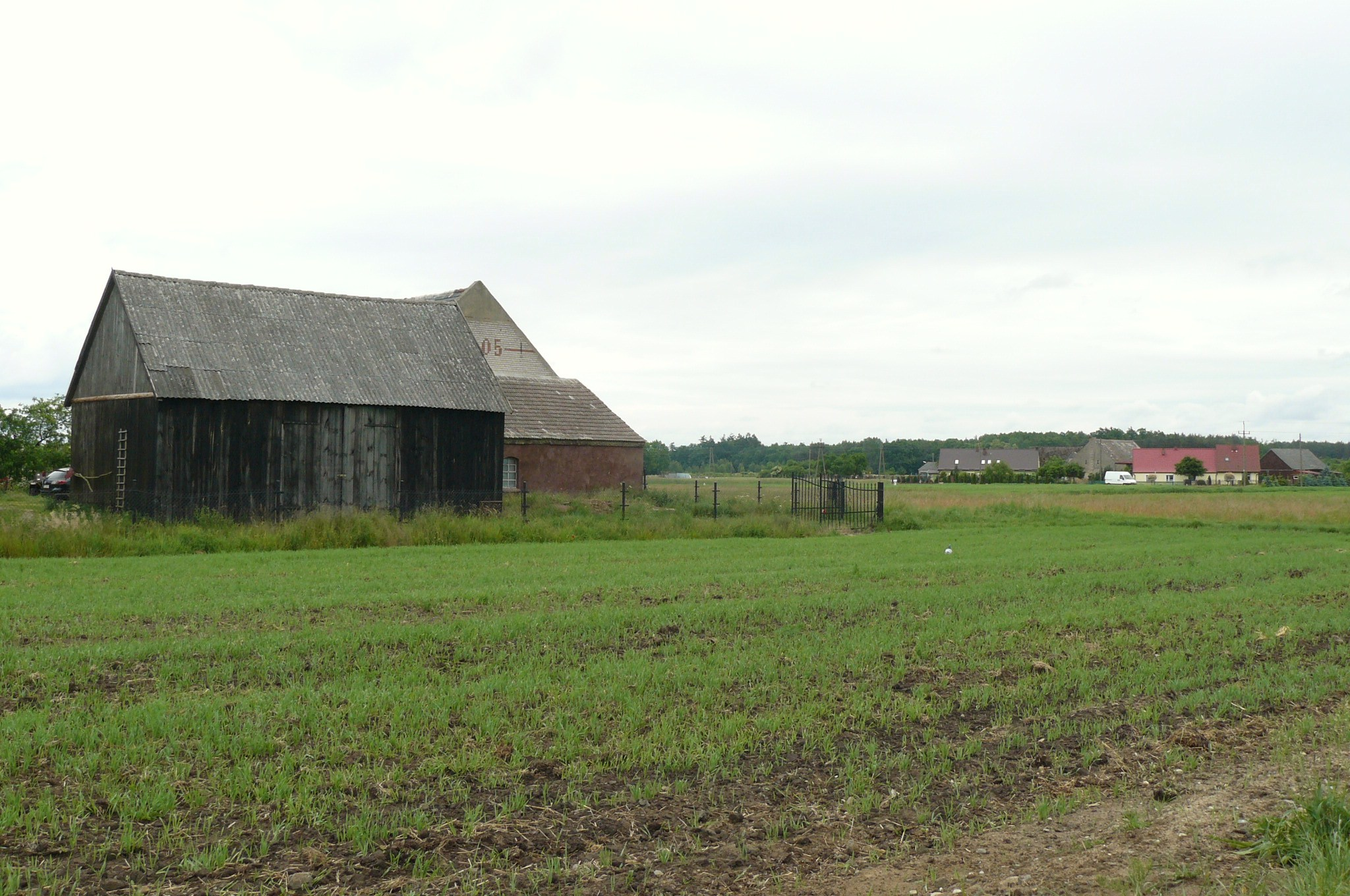
- View of Marzenin, Lubusz Voivodeship

- Location within Poland
- Coordinates: 52°48′10″N 15°52′54″E
- Country: Poland
- Voivodeship: Lubusz
- County: Strzelce-Drezdenko
- Gmina: Drezdenko

Marzenin [maˈʐɛnin] is a village in the administrative district of Gmina Drezdenko, within Strzelce-Drezdenko County, Lubusz Voivodeship, in western Poland.
