= Kosin, Lubusz Voivodeship =

Kosin
- Village
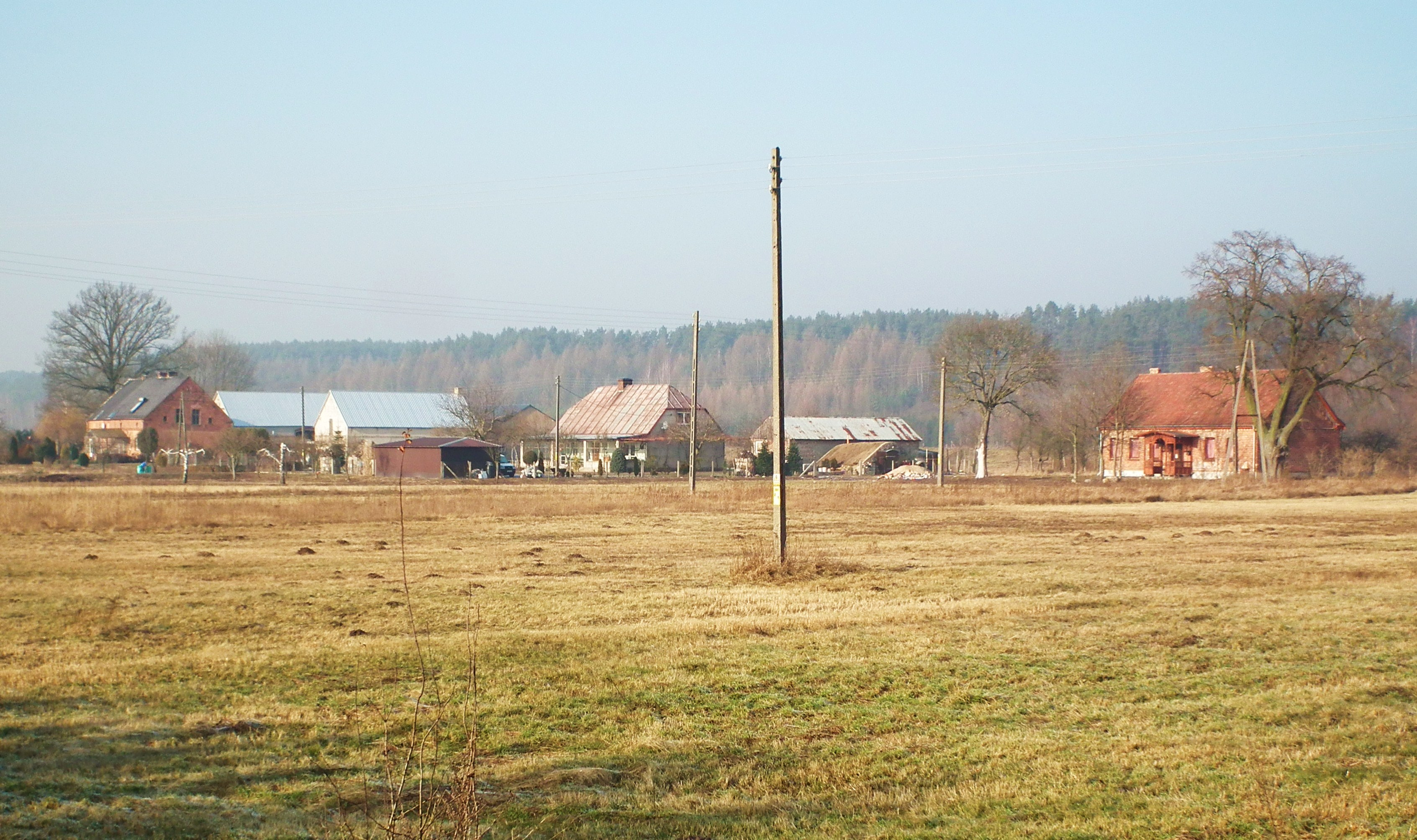

- Location within Poland
- Coordinates: 52°50′31″N 15°53′38″E
- Country: Poland
- Voivodeship: Lubusz
- County: Strzelce-Drezdenko
- Gmina: Drezdenko

Kosin [ˈkɔɕin] is a village in the administrative district of Gmina Drezdenko, within Strzelce-Drezdenko County, Lubusz Voivodeship, in western Poland.
