= Górzyska =

- Village
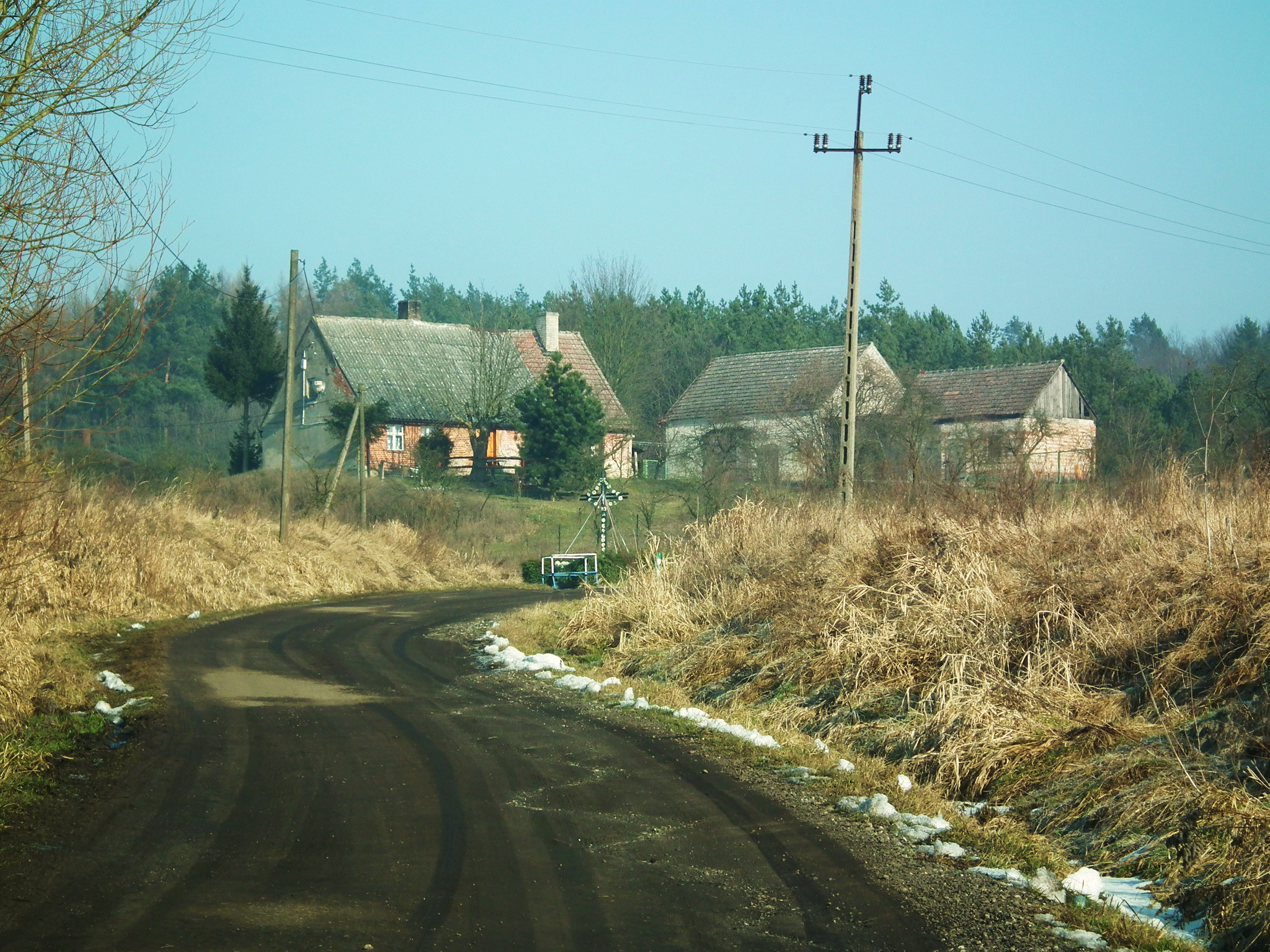
- The village of Górzyska on the edge of the valley of Noteć

- Location within Poland
- Coordinates: 52°52′08″N 15°44′58″E
- Country: Poland
- Voivodeship: Lubusz
- County: Strzelce-Drezdenko
- Gmina: Drezdenko

Górzyska [ɡuˈʐɨska] is a village in the administrative district of Gmina Drezdenko, within Strzelce-Drezdenko County, Lubusz Voivodeship, in western Poland.
