= Przeborowo =

- Village
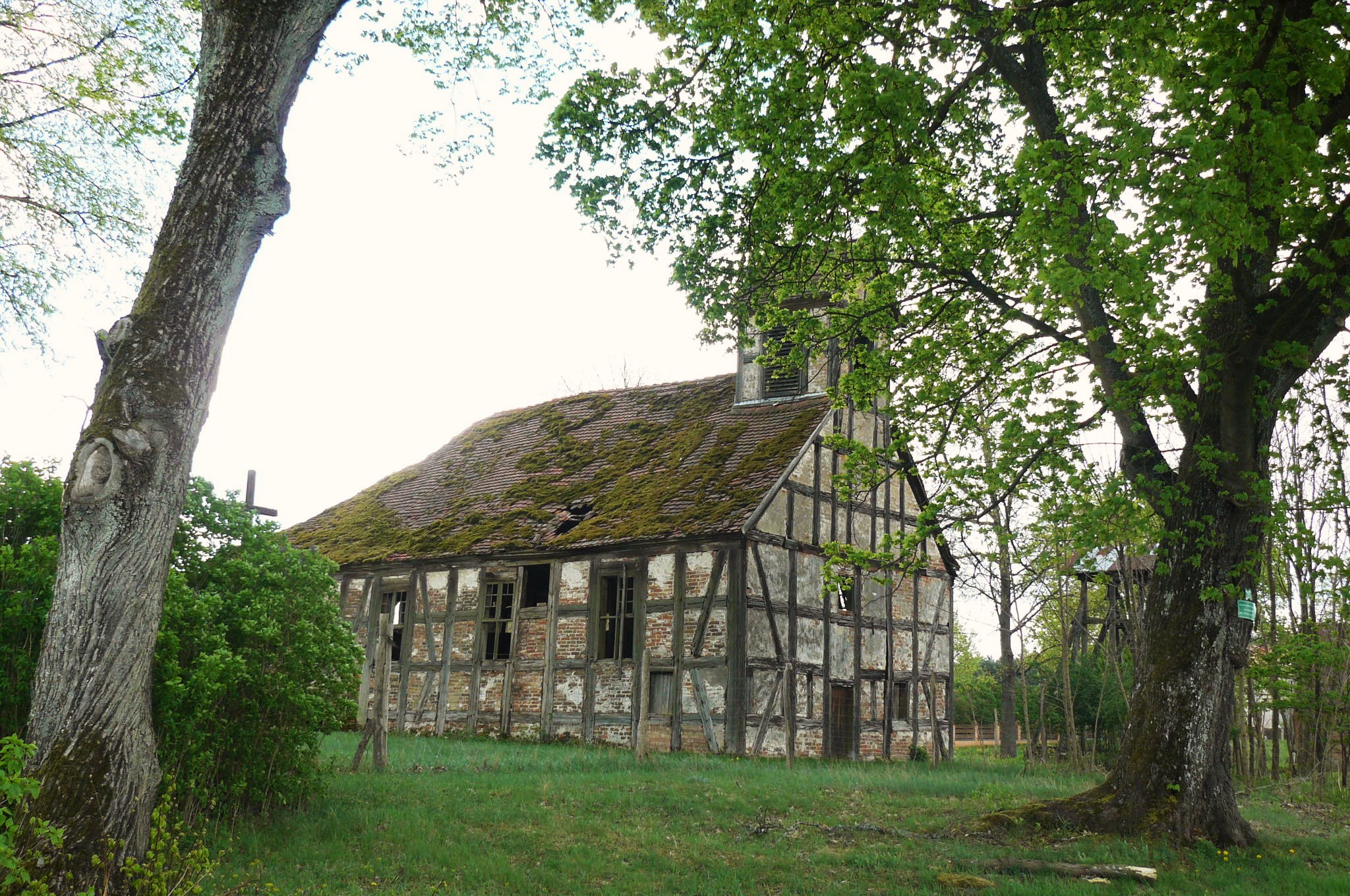
- Former church

- Location within Poland
- Coordinates: 52°55′N 15°58′E
- Country: Poland
- Voivodeship: Lubusz
- County: Strzelce-Drezdenko
- Gmina: Drezdenko
- Website: przeborowo.za.pl

Przeborowo [pʂɛbɔˈrɔvɔ] is a village in the administrative district of Gmina Drezdenko, within Strzelce-Drezdenko County, Lubusz Voivodeship, in western Poland.
