= Karwin, Lubusz Voivodeship =

Karwin
- Village
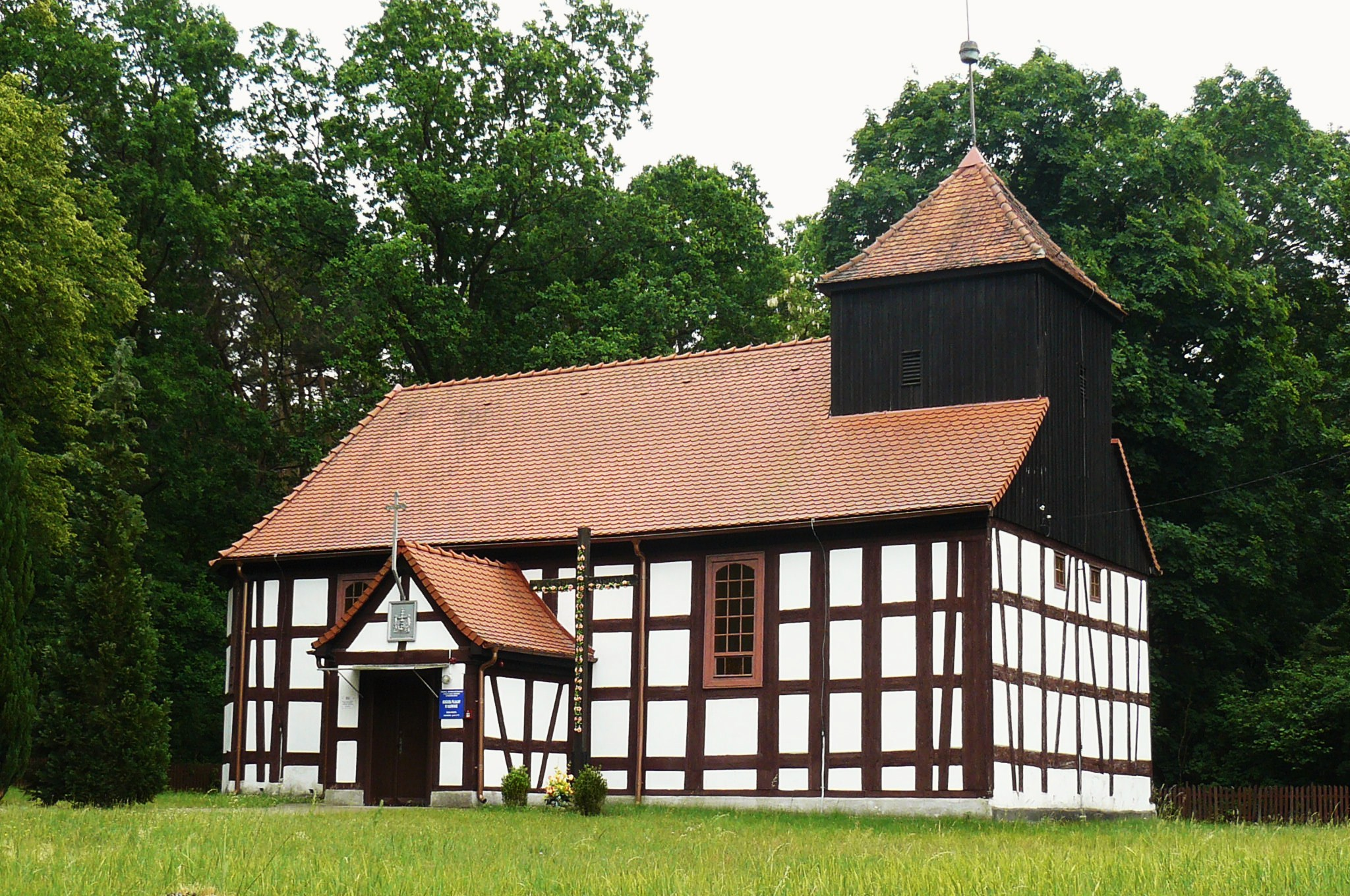
- Timber-framed Catholic church

- Location within Poland
- Coordinates: 52°47′N 15°54′E
- Country: Poland
- Voivodeship: Lubusz
- County: Strzelce-Drezdenko
- Gmina: Drezdenko

Karwin [ˈkarvin] is a village in the administrative district of Gmina Drezdenko, within Strzelce-Drezdenko County, Lubusz Voivodeship, in western Poland.
