= Goszczanowo =

- Village
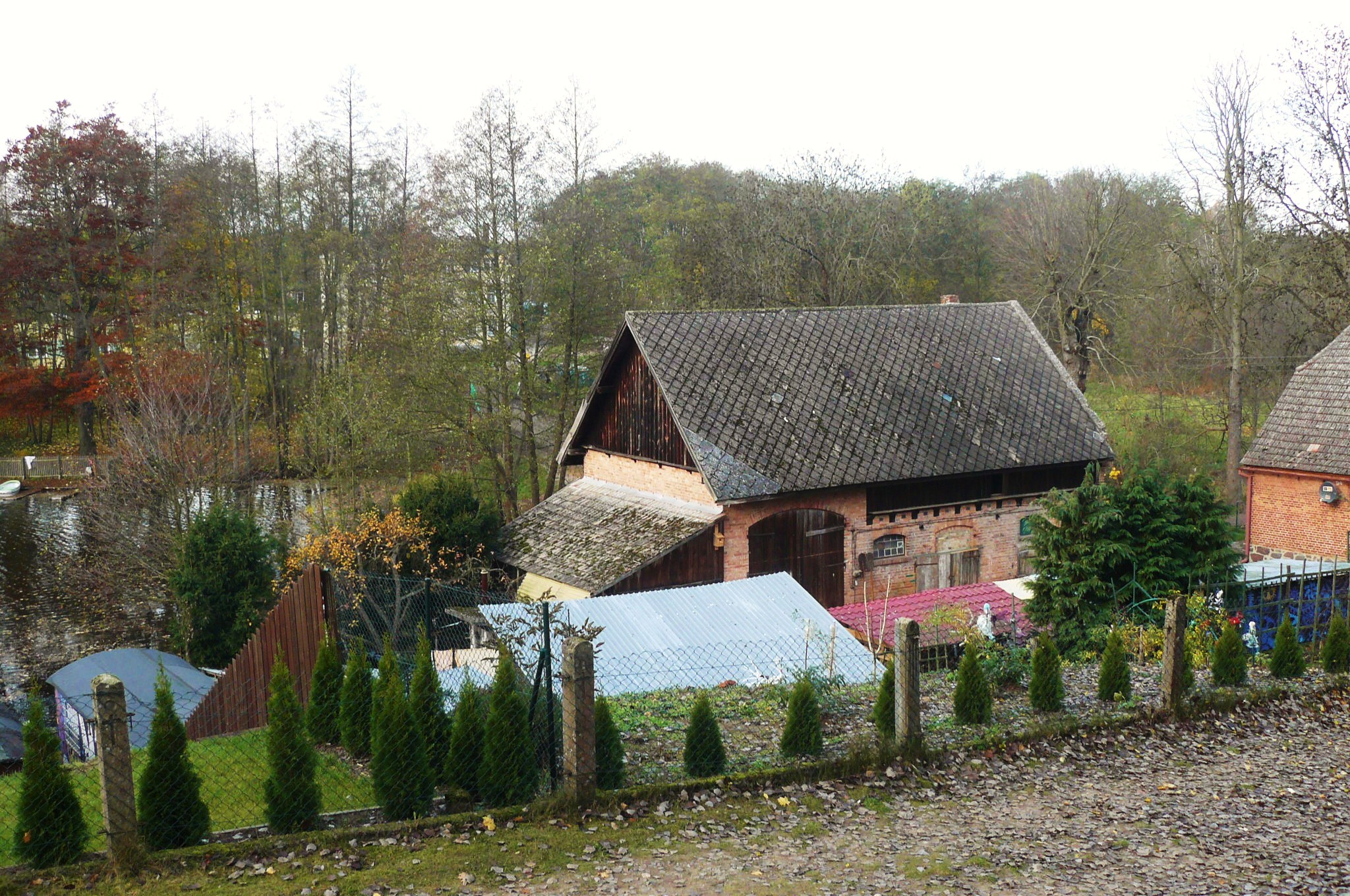
- Village development at the Goszczanowski Pond

- Location within Poland
- Coordinates: 52°43′N 15°37′E
- Country: Poland
- Voivodeship: Lubusz
- County: Strzelce-Drezdenko
- Gmina: Drezdenko
- Elevation: 36 m (118 ft)

Population
  - Total: 300

Goszczanowo [ɡɔʂt͡ʂaˈnɔvɔ] (German: Guscht) is a village in the administrative district of Gmina Drezdenko, within Strzelce-Drezdenko County, Lubusz Voivodeship, in western Poland.

From 1954 to 1957, the village was part of the Goszczanowo commune and served as its administrative center. After the commune’s abolition, the village was included in the Guest cluster. Between 1975 and 1998, the village was administratively part of the Gorzów Province.

== Geography ==
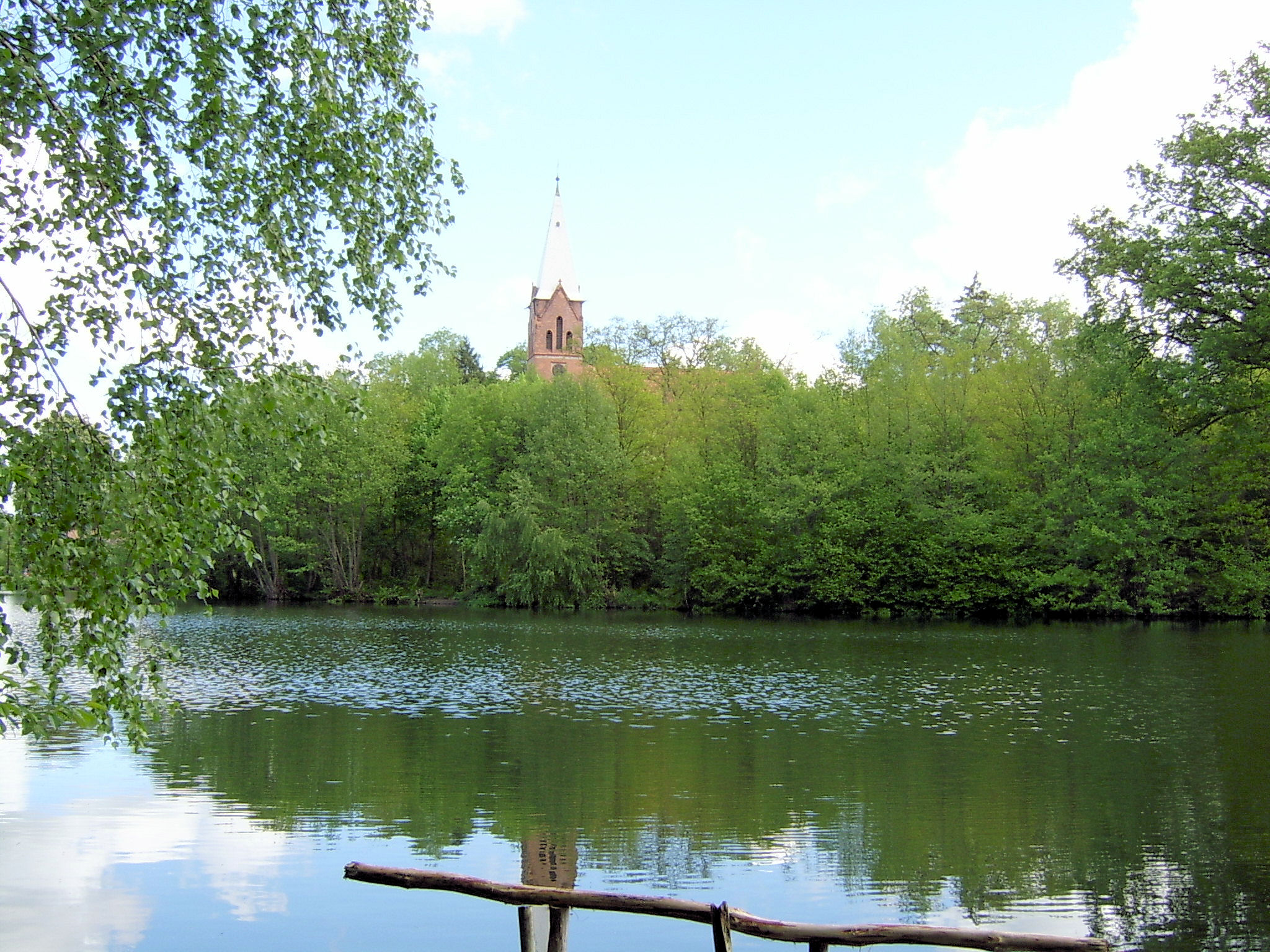
the Goszczanowski Pond, in the background of the church of St. Jana Vianney

The village is located in the western part of the Drezdenko commune, on the northwestern edge of the Notecka Forest. It is situated along the Goszczanowska Struga, which flows from the Goszczanowski Pond (Lake Makielskie). The Skwierzyna-Drezdenko highway runs through the village, with a local branch leading to Goszczanówk.

== History ==
An old Polish settlement located south of Noteć, in an area that was detached from Wielkopolska by Brandenburg in the Middle Ages, but remained a subject of Polish-Brandenburg disputes for a long time. Traces of settlement continuity date back to 2500 BC through the 3rd period of the Bronze Age (a cemetery of the Lusatian culture from 1300–1100 BC) to a settlement from the period of provincial and Roman culture (a vestige of a man from the time of Emperor Caracalla). In the Middle Ages, the route from Drenia (Drezdenka) to Skwierzyna ran through this area.

The German name Guscht (also written as Guschte in 1809) is undoubtedly of Slavic origin. German scientist Dr. Mucke derives it from the Pomeranian name Chwost. The reconstructed Polish name has a patronymic character and is associated with the name Goszcza. In 1338, the village was received from the Margraves of Brandenburg, although legally the area belonged to Poland. As late as the 17th century, Poland renewed its claims to this area. In 1641, the New March government reported to the elector that according to the claims of the castellan of Międzyrzecz, "the villages of Goszczanowo, Trzebicz, Lubiatów belonged to the Polish Crown and that again in a few years they will belong to it."

In 1763, a farm was established in Goszczanów. By 1774, a school was recorded in the village. In 1809, a royal forester was stationed in the Gościmski district. The greatest development of the village occurred at the beginning of the 20th century, with the establishment of a mill and a forge, and the construction of a railroad line from Skwierzyna to Drezdenko. During World War II, a prisoner of war camp was located in Goszczanów.
