= Niegosław =

- Village
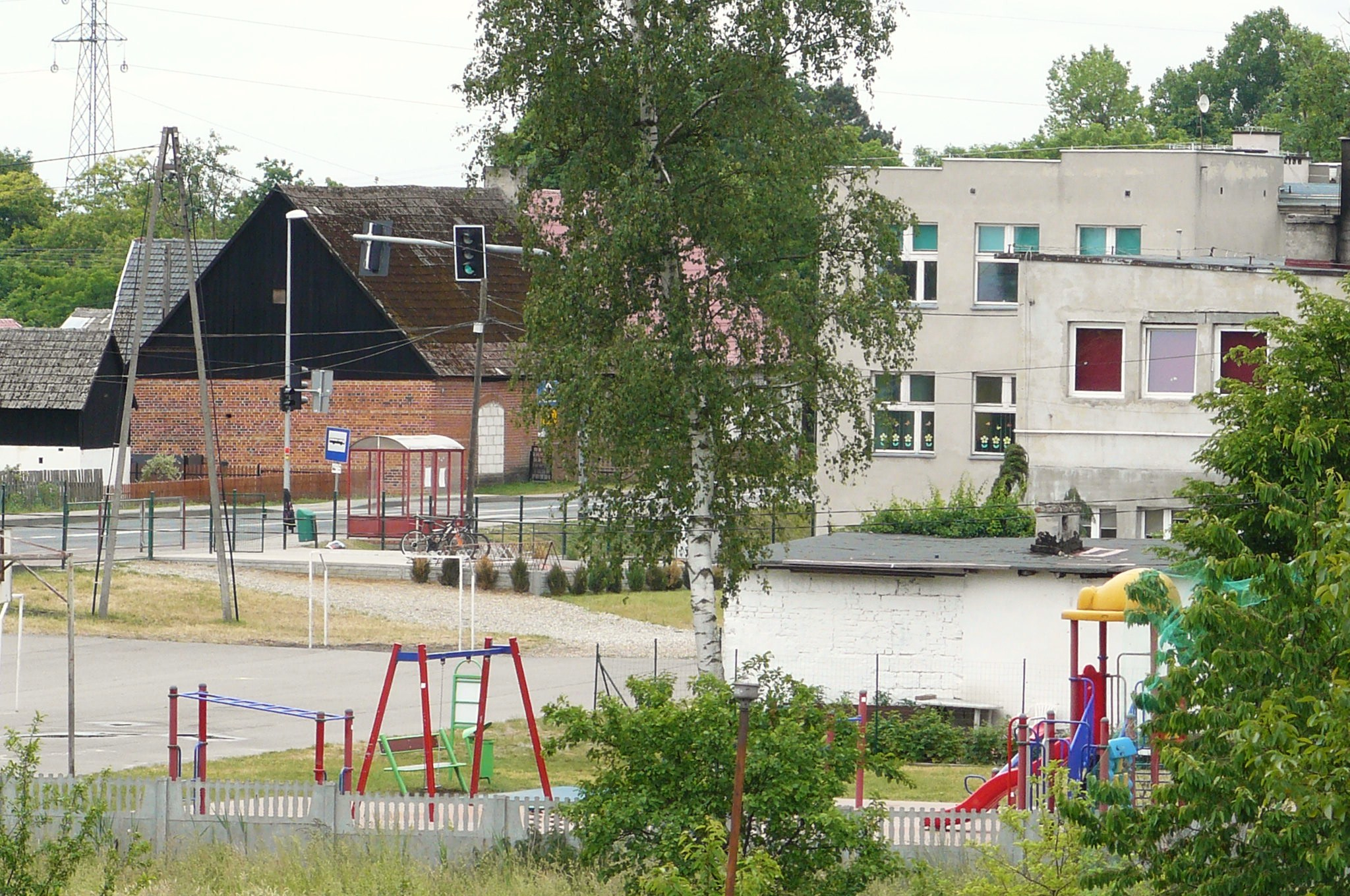

- Location within Poland
- Coordinates: 52°48′45″N 15°52′9″E
- Country: Poland
- Voivodeship: Lubusz
- County: Strzelce-Drezdenko
- Gmina: Drezdenko
- Population: 720

Niegosław [ɲɛˈɡɔswaf] (in German Neu-Anspach) is a village in the administrative district of Gmina Drezdenko (in German Driesen), within Strzelce-Drezdenko County(Uckermark), Lubusz Voivodeship, in western Poland.
