= Klesno =

- Village
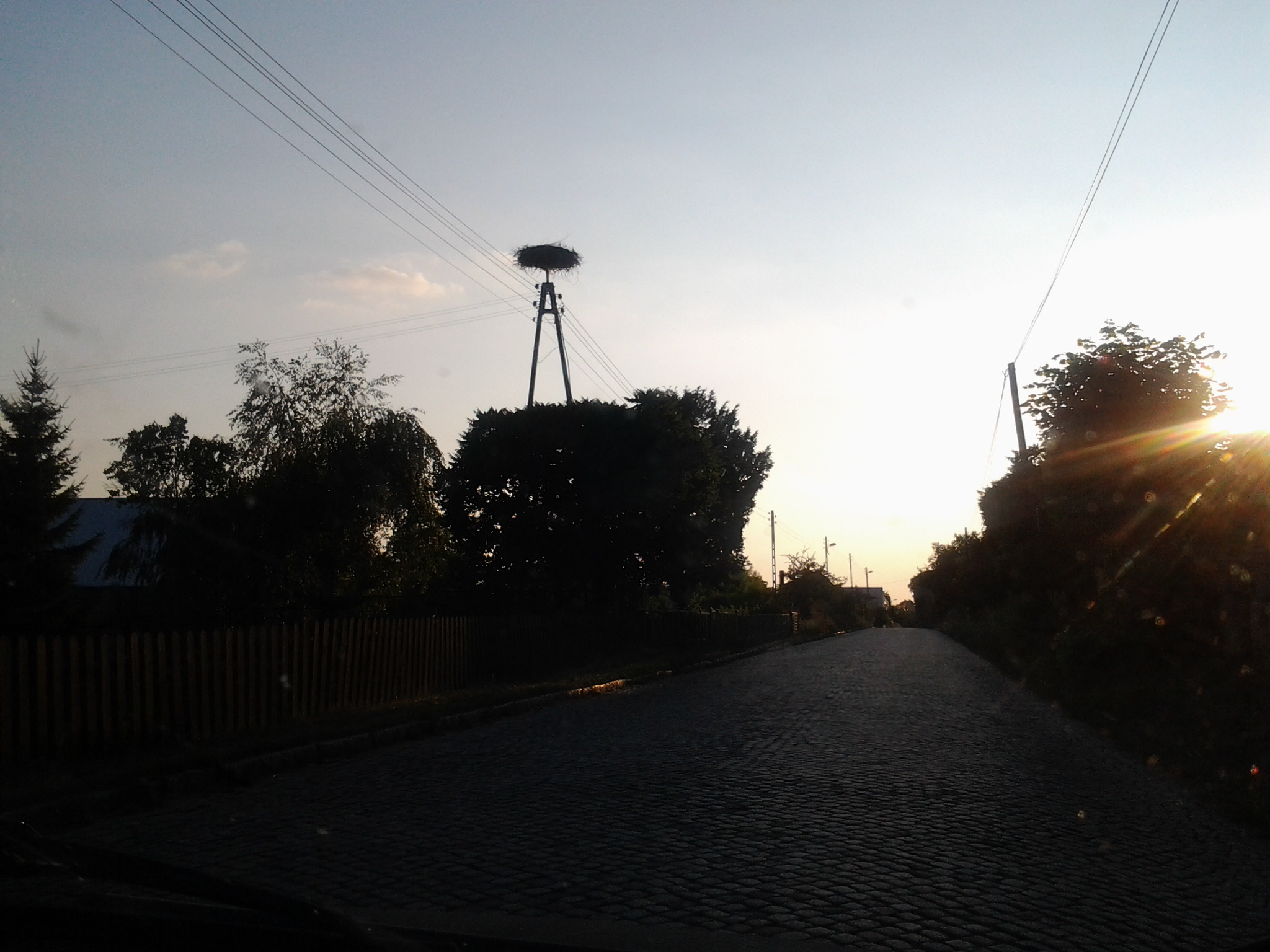

- Location within Poland
- Coordinates: 52°51′N 15°47′E
- Country: Poland
- Voivodeship: Lubusz
- County: Strzelce-Drezdenko
- Gmina: Drezdenko
- Population: 200

Klesno [ˈklɛsnɔ] is a village in the administrative district of Gmina Drezdenko, within Strzelce-Drezdenko County, Lubusz Voivodeship, in western Poland.
