= Zielątkowo, Lubusz Voivodeship =

Zielątkowo
- Village
- Location within Poland
- Coordinates: 52°45′27″N 15°41′3″E
- Country: Poland
- Voivodeship: Lubusz
- County: Strzelce-Drezdenko
- Gmina: Drezdenko

Zielątkowo [ʑɛlɔntˈkɔvɔ] is a village in the administrative district of Gmina Drezdenko, within Strzelce-Drezdenko County, Lubusz Voivodeship, in western Poland.
