= Lipno, Strzelce-Drezdenko County =

Lipno
- Village
- Location within Poland
- Coordinates: 52°49′22″N 15°53′4″E
- Country: Poland
- Voivodeship: Lubusz
- County: Strzelce-Drezdenko
- Gmina: Drezdenko
- Population: 270

Lipno (Polish pronunciation: [ˈlipnɔ]) is a village in the administrative district of Gmina Drezdenko, within Strzelce-Drezdenko County, Lubusz Voivodeship, in western Poland.
