= Lipowo, Lubusz Voivodeship =

Lipowo
- Settlement
- Location within Poland
- Coordinates: 52°55′35″N 15°54′59″E
- Country: Poland
- Voivodeship: Lubusz
- County: Strzelce-Drezdenko
- Gmina: Drezdenko
- Population: 20

Lipowo [liˈpɔvɔ] is a settlement in the administrative district of Gmina Drezdenko, within Strzelce-Drezdenko County, Lubusz Voivodeship, in western Poland.
