= Modropole =

- Village
- Location within Poland
- Coordinates: 52°52′N 15°44′E
- Country: Poland
- Voivodeship: Lubusz
- County: Strzelce-Drezdenko
- Gmina: Drezdenko

Modropole [mɔdrɔˈpɔlɛ] is a village in the administrative district of Gmina Drezdenko, within Strzelce-Drezdenko County, Lubusz Voivodeship, in western Poland.
