= Drawiny =

- Village
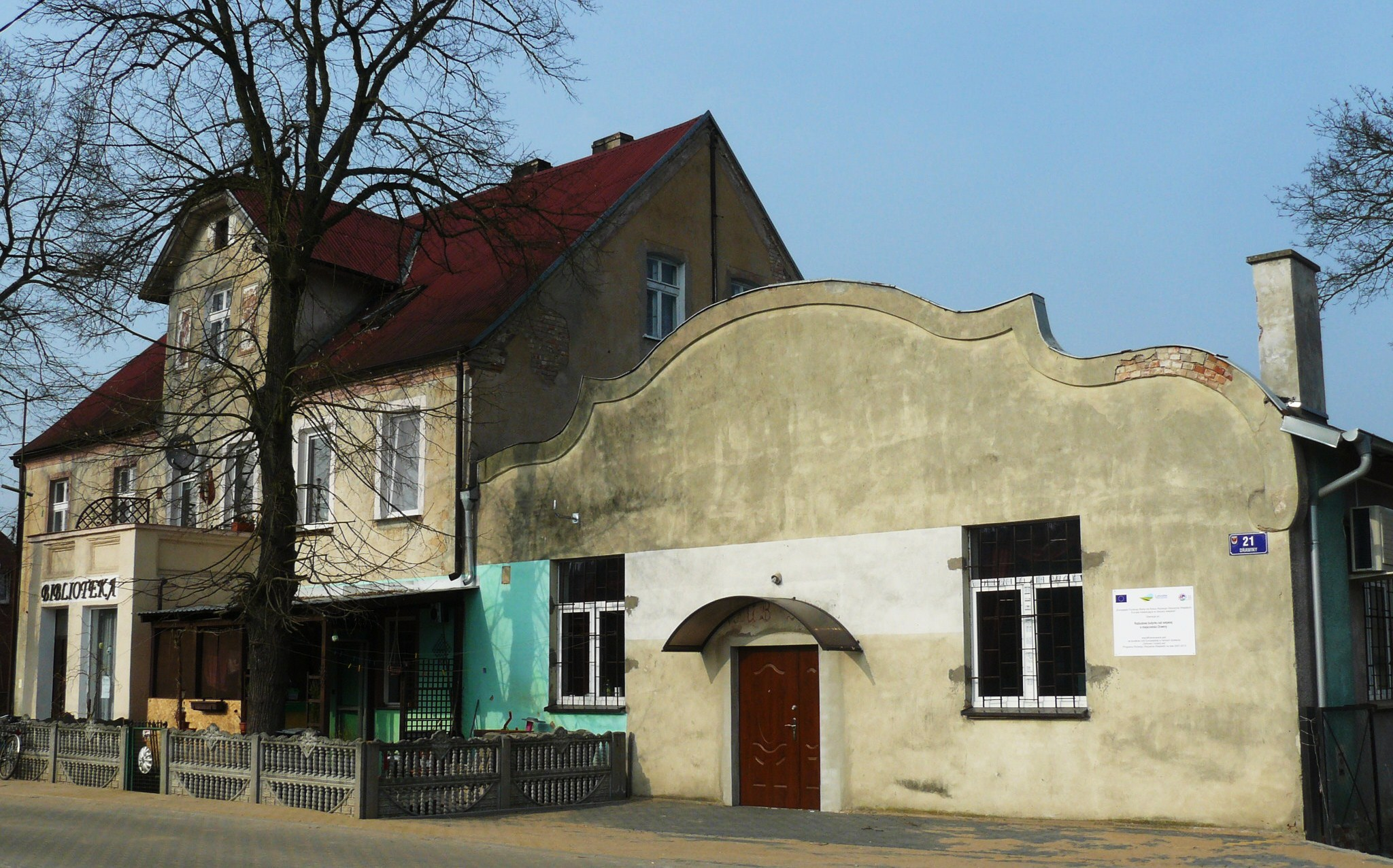

- Location within Poland
- Coordinates: 52°54′N 15°57′E
- Country: Poland
- Voivodeship: Lubusz
- County: Strzelce-Drezdenko
- Gmina: Drezdenko
- Population: 470
- Website: www.drawiny.xorg.pl

Drawiny [draˈvinɨ] is a village in the administrative district of Gmina Drezdenko, within Strzelce-Drezdenko County, Lubusz Voivodeship, in western Poland.
