= Osów, Lubusz Voivodeship =

Osów
- Village
- Location within Poland
- Coordinates: 52°49′N 15°48′E
- Country: Poland
- Voivodeship: Lubusz
- County: Strzelce-Drezdenko
- Gmina: Drezdenko

Osów [ˈɔsuf] is a village in the administrative district of Gmina Drezdenko, within Strzelce-Drezdenko County, Lubusz Voivodeship, in western Poland.
