= Grotów, Strzelce-Drezdenko County =

Grotów
- Village
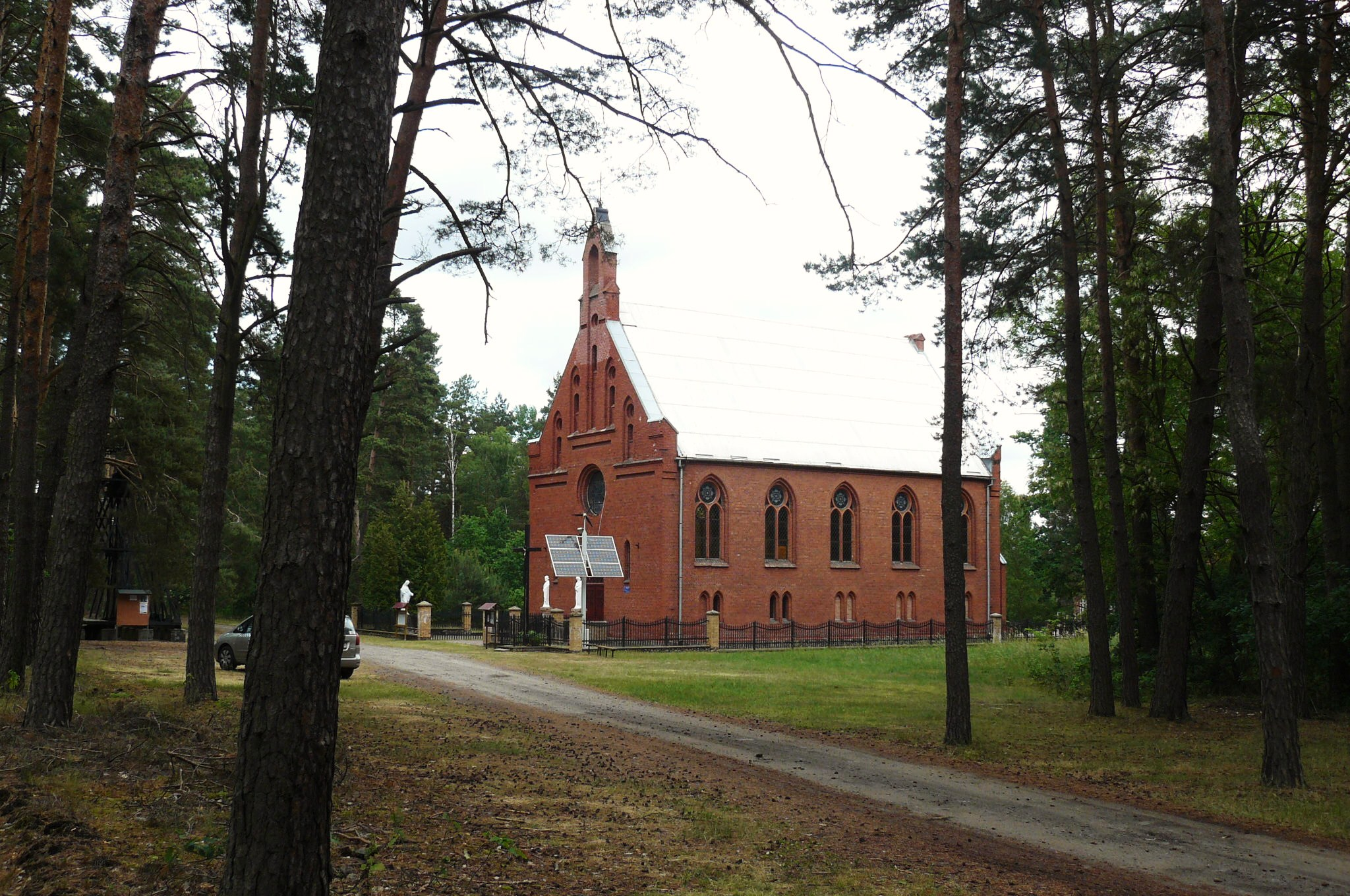
- Catholic church

- Location within Poland
- Coordinates: 52°45′N 15°51′E
- Country: Poland
- Voivodeship: Lubusz
- County: Strzelce-Drezdenko
- Gmina: Drezdenko

Grotów [ˈɡrɔtuf] is a village in the administrative district of Gmina Drezdenko, within Strzelce-Drezdenko County, Lubusz Voivodeship, in western Poland.
