= Duraczewo =

- Village
- Location within Poland
- Coordinates: 52°44′N 15°37′E
- Country: Poland
- Voivodeship: Lubusz
- County: Strzelce-Drezdenko
- Gmina: Drezdenko

Duraczewo [duraˈt͡ʂɛvɔ] is a village in the administrative district of Gmina Drezdenko, within Strzelce-Drezdenko County, Lubusz Voivodeship, in western Poland.
