= Tuczępy, Strzelce-Drezdenko County =

Tuczępy
- Village
- Location within Poland
- Coordinates: 52°48′50″N 15°53′16″E
- Country: Poland
- Voivodeship: Lubusz
- County: Strzelce-Drezdenko
- Gmina: Drezdenko

Tuczępy [tuˈt͡ʂɛmpɨ] (German: Aarhorst) is a village in the administrative district of Gmina Drezdenko, within Strzelce-Drezdenko County, Lubusz Voivodeship, in western Poland.
