= Bagniewo, Lubusz Voivodeship =

Bagniewo
- Village
- Location within Poland
- Coordinates: 52°47′N 15°43′E
- Country: Poland
- Voivodeship: Lubusz
- County: Strzelce-Drezdenko
- Gmina: Drezdenko
- Population: 100

Bagniewo [baɡˈɲɛvɔ] is a village in the administrative district of Gmina Drezdenko, within Strzelce-Drezdenko County, Lubusz Voivodeship, in western Poland.
