= Zagórze, Strzelce-Drezdenko County =

Zagórze
- Village
- Location within Poland
- Coordinates: 52°53′15″N 15°51′42″E
- Country: Poland
- Voivodeship: Lubusz
- County: Strzelce-Drezdenko
- Gmina: Drezdenko

Zagórze [zaˈɡuʐɛ] is a village in the administrative district of Gmina Drezdenko, within Strzelce-Drezdenko County, Lubusz Voivodeship, in western Poland.
