= Czartowo, Lubusz Voivodeship =

Czartowo
- Village
- Location within Poland
- Coordinates: 52°48′30″N 15°50′51″E
- Country: Poland
- Voivodeship: Lubusz
- County: Strzelce-Drezdenko
- Gmina: Drezdenko

Czartowo [t͡ʂarˈtɔvɔ] is a village in the administrative district of Gmina Drezdenko, within Strzelce-Drezdenko County, Lubusz Voivodeship, in western Poland.
