= Kijów, Lubusz Voivodeship =

Kijów
- Village
- Location within Poland
- Coordinates: 52°43′38″N 15°36′10″E
- Country: Poland
- Voivodeship: Lubusz
- County: Strzelce-Drezdenko
- Gmina: Drezdenko

Kijów (Polish pronunciation: [ˈkʲijuf]) is a village in the administrative district of Gmina Drezdenko, within Strzelce-Drezdenko County, Lubusz Voivodeship, in western Poland.
