= Rąpin =

- Village
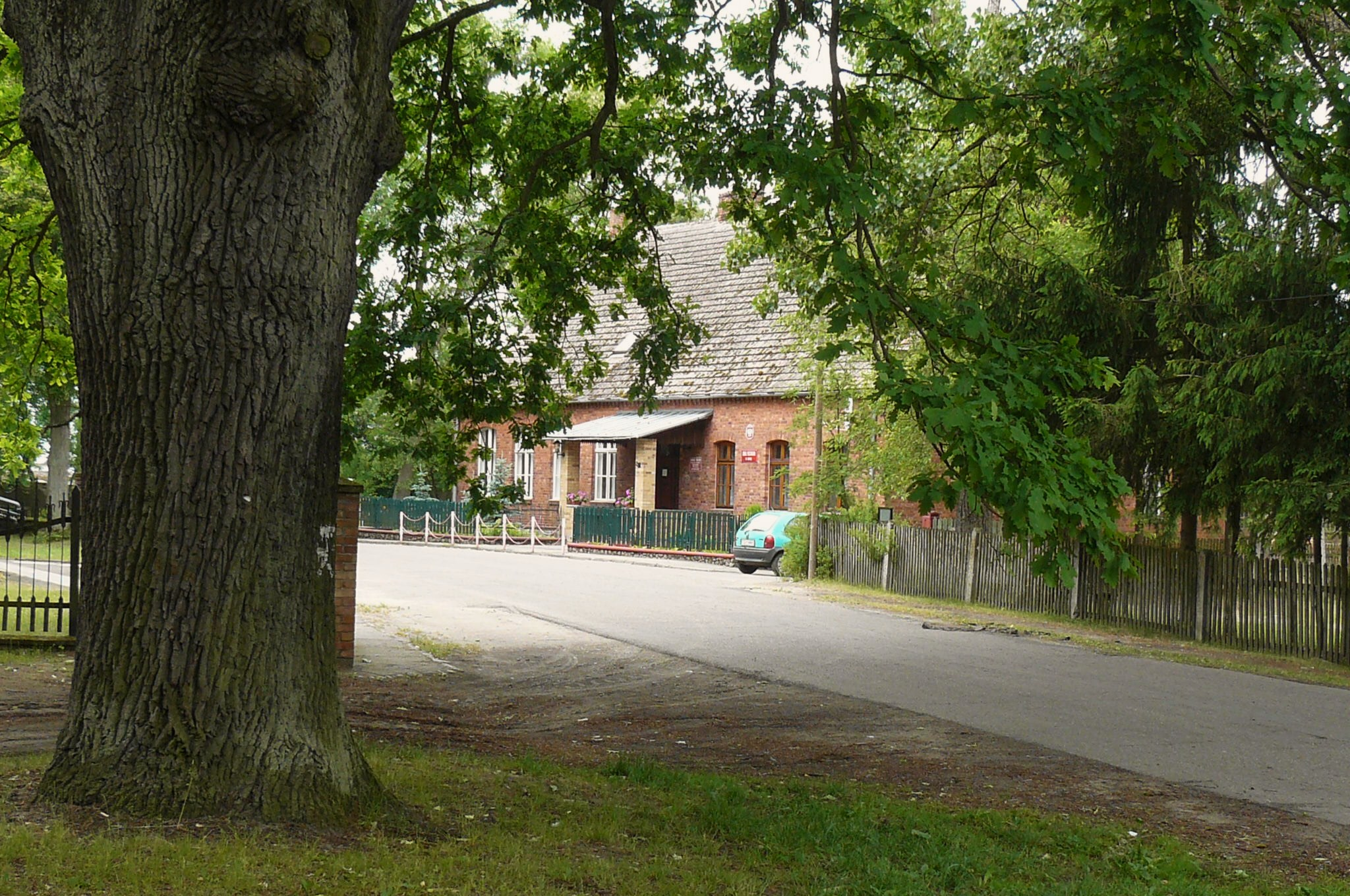
- An old school in Rąpin

- Location within Poland
- Coordinates: 52°47′03″N 15°49′50″E
- Country: Poland
- Voivodeship: Lubusz
- County: Strzelce-Drezdenko
- Gmina: Drezdenko
- Population: 440

Rąpin [ˈrɔmpin] is a village in the administrative district of Gmina Drezdenko, within Strzelce-Drezdenko County, Lubusz Voivodeship, in western Poland.
