= Trebitsch =

Trebitsch is a surname. Notable people with the surname include:

- Abraham Trebitsch (c. 1760–?), Austrian scholar
- Arthur Trebitsch (1880–1927) Austrian writer and racial theorist
- Gyula Trebitsch (1914–2005), German film producer
- Ignaz Trebitsch-Lincoln (1879–1943), Hungarian adventurer
- Nahum Trebitsch (1779–1842), Czech-Austrian rabbi
- Siegfried Trebitsch (1868–1956), Austrian playwright, translator, novelist and poet
- Willy Trenk-Trebitsch (1902–1983), Austrian actor

== See also ==
- Třebíč
- Trzebicz (disambiguation)
