= Gościm =

- Village
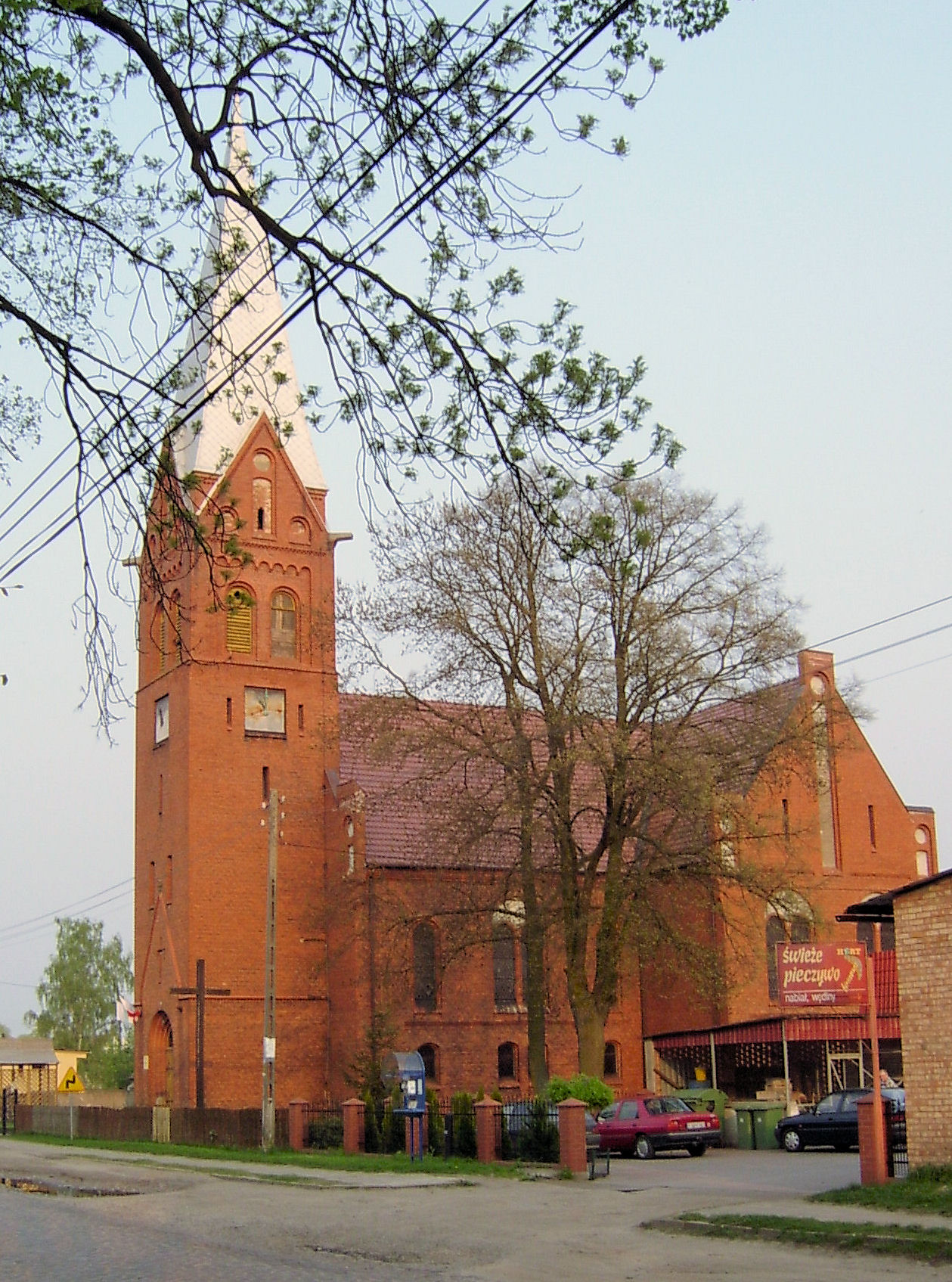
- Church of the Immaculate Conception of the Virgin Mary

- Location within Poland
- Coordinates: 52°46′N 15°42′E
- Country: Poland
- Voivodeship: Lubusz
- County: Strzelce-Drezdenko
- Gmina: Drezdenko

Population
  - Total: 520

Gościm (Polish: [ˈɡɔɕt͡ɕim]) is a village in the administrative district of Gmina Drezdenko, within Strzelce-Drezdenko County, Lubusz Voivodeship, in western Poland.
