= Lubiewo, Lubusz Voivodeship =

Lubiewo
- Village
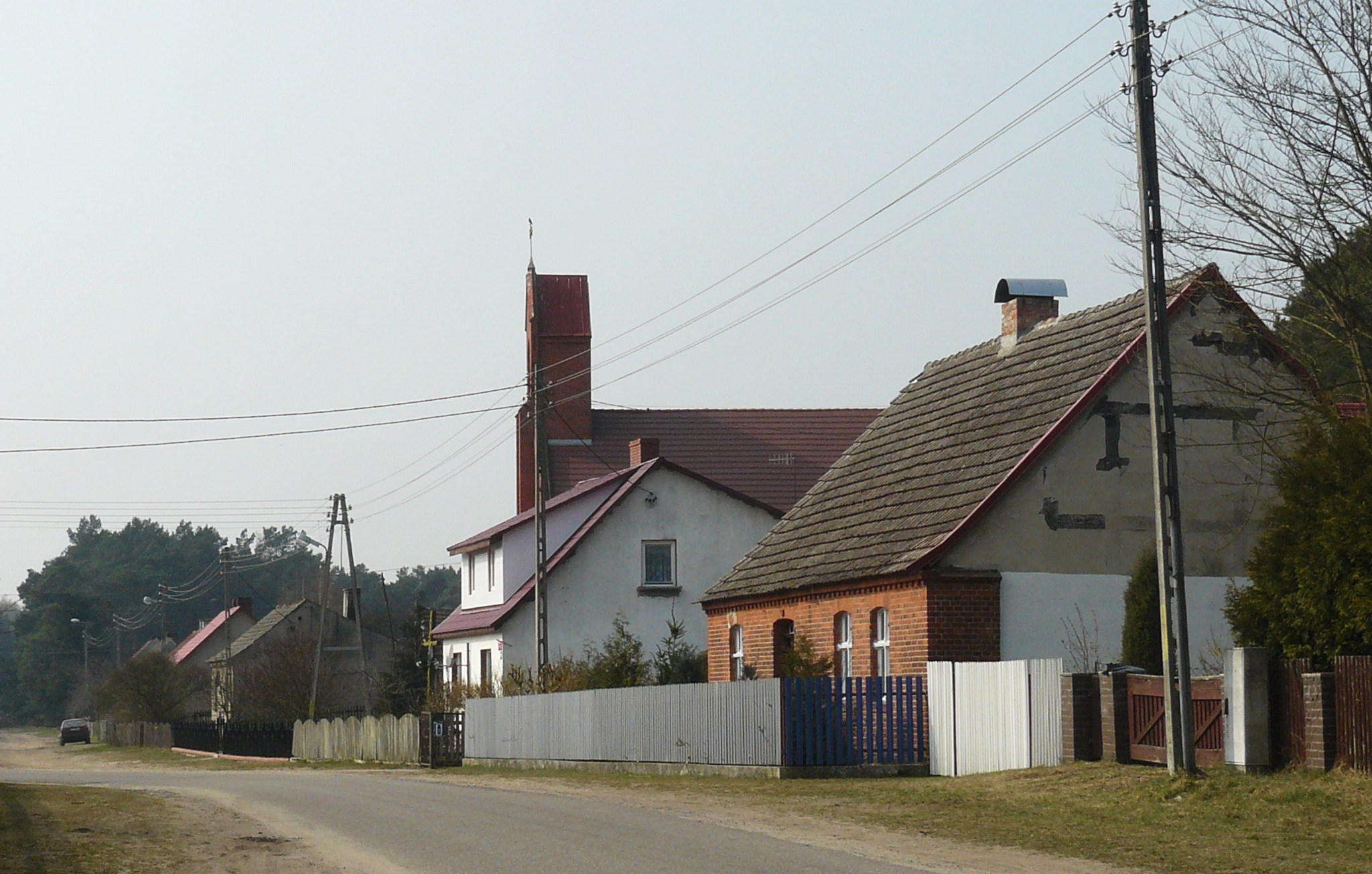

- Location within Poland
- Coordinates: 52°53′N 15°54′E
- Country: Poland
- Voivodeship: Lubusz
- County: Strzelce-Drezdenko
- Gmina: Drezdenko

Lubiewo [luˈbjɛvɔ] is a village in the administrative district of Gmina Drezdenko, within Strzelce-Drezdenko County, Lubusz Voivodeship, in western Poland.
