= Trzebicz-Młyn =

- Village
- Location within Poland
- Coordinates: 52°47′21″N 15°44′22″E
- Country: Poland
- Voivodeship: Lubusz
- County: Strzelce-Drezdenko
- Gmina: Drezdenko

Trzebicz-Młyn [ˈtʂɛbit͡ʂ ˈmwɨn] is a village in the administrative district of Gmina Drezdenko, within Strzelce-Drezdenko County, Lubusz Voivodeship, in western Poland.
