= Stare Bielice, Lubusz Voivodeship =

Stare Bielice
- Village
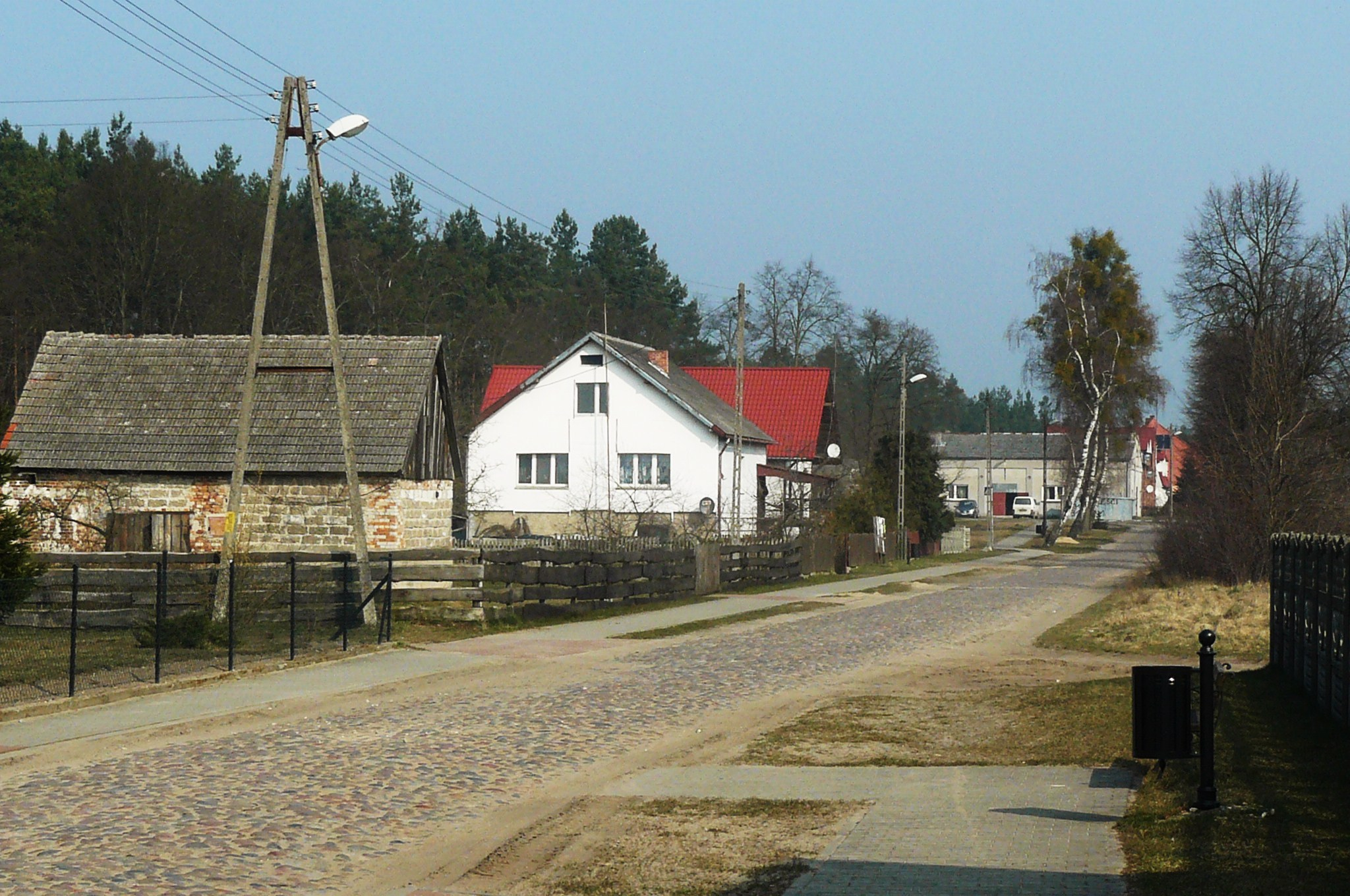
- The village

- Location within Poland
- Coordinates: 52°51′N 15°55′E
- Country: Poland
- Voivodeship: Lubusz
- County: Strzelce-Drezdenko
- Gmina: Drezdenko

Stare Bielice [ˈstarɛ bjɛˈlit͡sɛ] is a village in the administrative district of Gmina Drezdenko, within Strzelce-Drezdenko County, Lubusz Voivodeship, in western Poland.

== Notable residents ==
- Günther Maleuda (1931–2012), German politician
