= Strzelce Krajeńskie =

Town in Lubusz Voivodeship, Poland

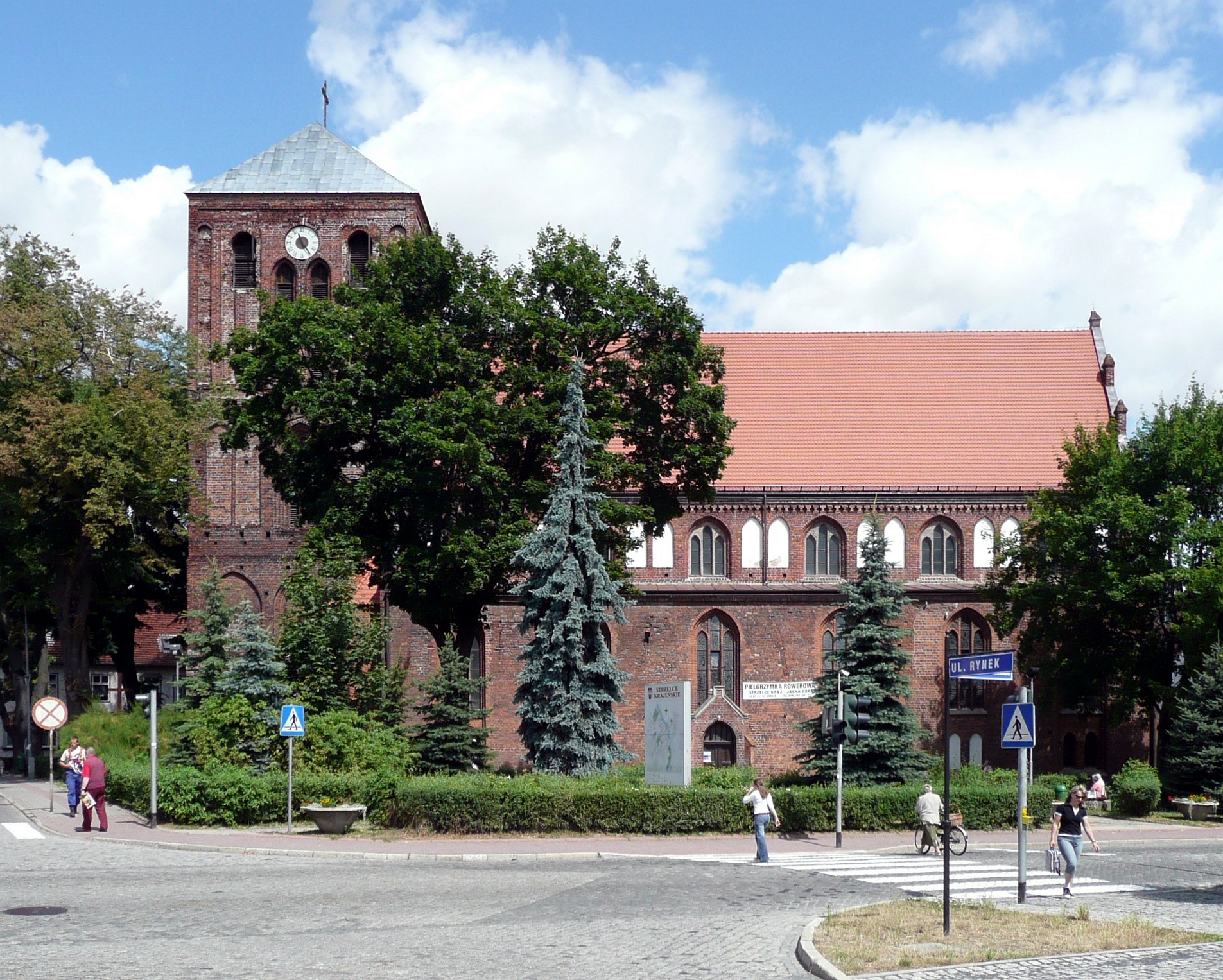
- Our Lady of the Rosary church in Strzelce Krajeńskie

- Flag Coat of arms

- Location within Poland
- Coordinates: 52°52′32″N 15°31′55″E
- Country: Poland
- Voivodeship: Lubusz
- County: Strzelce-Drezdenko
- Gmina: Strzelce Krajeńskie

Government
  - Mayor: Mateusz Feder

Area
  - Total: 4.94 km^{2} (1.91 sq mi)

Population (2019-06-30)
  - Total: 9,950
  - Density: 2,010/km^{2} (5,220/sq mi)
- Time zone: UTC+1 (CET)
  - Summer (DST): UTC+2 (CEST)
- Postal code: 66-500
- Vehicle registration: FSD
- Website: http://www.strzelce.pl

Strzelce Krajeńskie [ˈstʂɛlt͡sɛ kraˈjɛɲskʲɛ] (German: Friedeberg in der Neumark) is a town in western Poland, in the Lubusz Voivodeship. It is the capital of the Strzelce-Drezdenko County. The town's population is 9,950 (2019).

== History ==
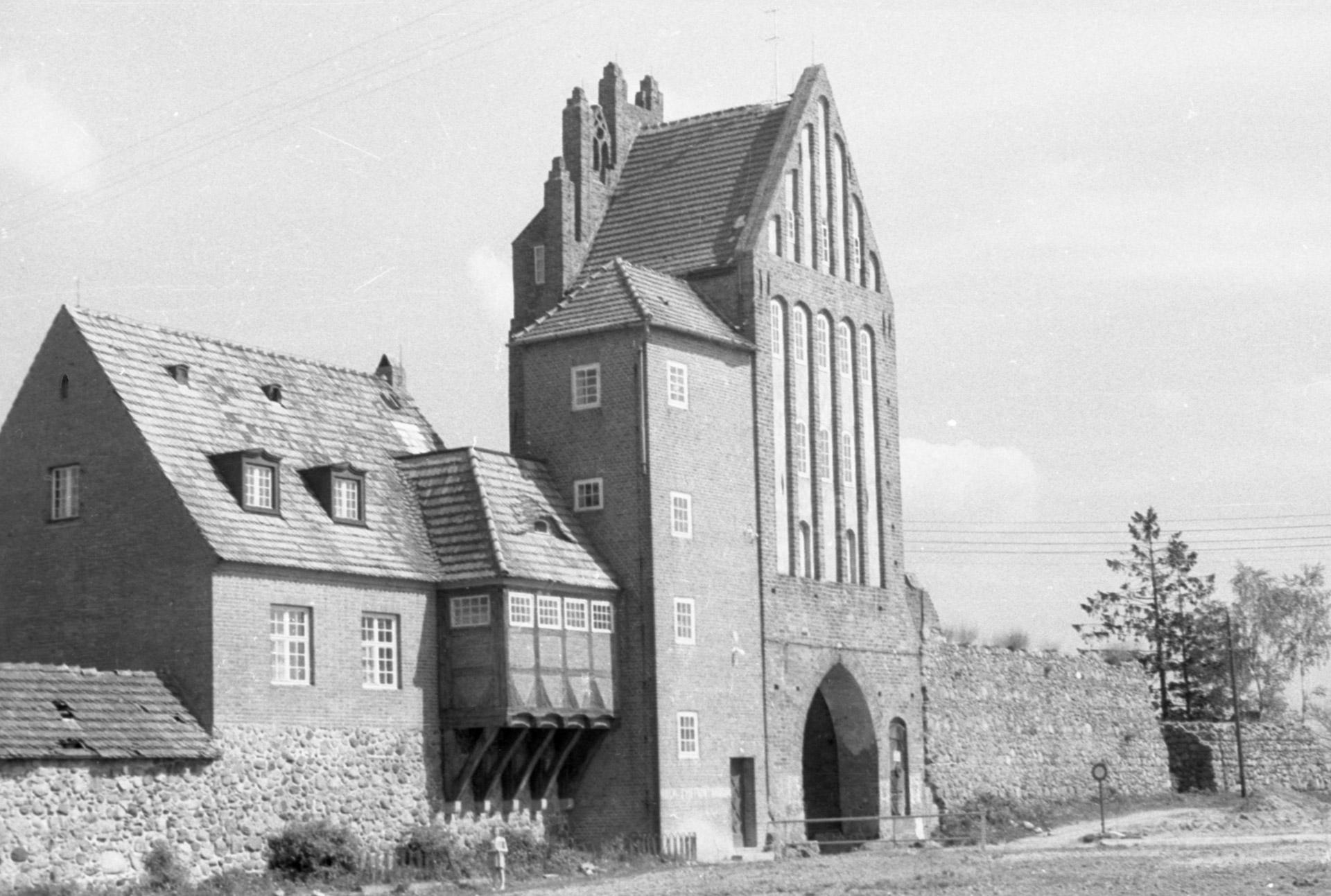
Medieval defensive walls and Mill Gate in 1950

The territory formed part of Poland since its establishment in the 10th century under the Piast dynasty. Following the fragmentation of Poland it was part of the Duchy of Greater Poland. In 1254, Margrave Conrad of Brandenburg-Stendal received the Santok castellany from Duke Przemysł I of Greater Poland as a dowry when he married his daughter. In a strategically favorable location, east of the town of Landsberg (Gorzów Wielkopolski), Conrad built a castle in the just-acquired Polish village. In 1269, the village came under German municipal law. The castle was destroyed by Przemysł I in 1272. The event was mentioned in the 13th-century Wielkopolska Chronicle, with Strzelce spelled Strzelci in Old Polish. Before 1286, the Margrave gave the newly created town Magdeburg rights under the name Friedeberg, probably derived from the Friedeberg family from the Saalkreis, who were part of his entourage. Friedeberg was laid out within a circular fortification with a chessboard-like plan and settled with immigrants from the area of the lower Saale and the Harz foreland in Germany.

In 1319, the town passed to the Duchy of Pomerania, and several years later it fell back to the Margraviate of Brandenburg. In the 14th century, the town gained importance when it received navigation rights for the Noteć and Warta rivers in 1345. In 1373, the town became part of the Bohemian (Czech) Crown, ruled by the Luxembourg dynasty. In 1402, the Luxembourgs reached an agreement with Poland in Kraków, under which Poland was to buy and re-incorporate the town and surrounding region, but eventually the Luxembourgs sold the town to the Teutonic Order. The Teutonic Order did little to develop the town, and during the Polish–Teutonic War of 1431–1435, the Hussites destroyed the town in 1433.

During the Thirty Years' War in 1637, imperial troops burned it down. At the end of the war, the population had fallen to a fifth of the pre-war level.

In 1717, Friedeberg became a Prussian garrison town, which resulted in an economic boom. In the 18th century, it benefited directly from the drainage program for the Noteć river, which was initiated by Frederick the Great in 1770. The location of Friedeberg on a military road led to a prolonged occupation by the Russians during the Seven Years' War. Marching armies also ravaged the area during the Napoleonic Wars.

With the Prussian administrative reorganization, Friedeberg became the capital of the Friedeberg district in Regierungsbezirk Frankfurt in the Province of Brandenburg in 1816. One of the main escape routes for surviving insurgents of the Polish November Uprising from partitioned Poland to the Great Emigration led through the town. The town initially benefited from the Berlin – Königsberg state road, which it touched directly. The equally important route of the Prussian Eastern Railway however, ran 7 km (4 mi) south, and it was not until 1897 that the connection to the main railway network could be completed with the construction of the Friedeberger Kleinbahn. The town belonged to Germany since 1871. When the province of Grenzmark Posen-West Prussia was dissolved in 1938, the Friedeberg district became part of the Province of Pomerania.

During World War II, the Germans operated three forced labour subcamps of the Stalag II-D prisoner-of-war camp for Allied POWs in the town. Towards the end of the war, the Red Army took Friedeberg almost without a fight on January 29, 1945, and deliberately burned around 80% of the town. In spring 1945, the town became again part of Poland under its historic Polish name Strzelce, and in 1946 the adjective Krajeńskie was added to distinguish it from other settlement of the same name. Ukrainians and Lemkos from the Beskids were also forcibly resettled in the region in 1947 as part of Operation Vistula.

== Sights ==
Among the preserved historic architecture of the city are:

- the medieval town walls with the Gothic Mill Gate (Brama Młyńska) and Prison Tower (Baszta Więzienna)
- the late Gothic Our Lady of the Rosary church
- an old granary from 1764
- old townhouses, including timber-framed houses
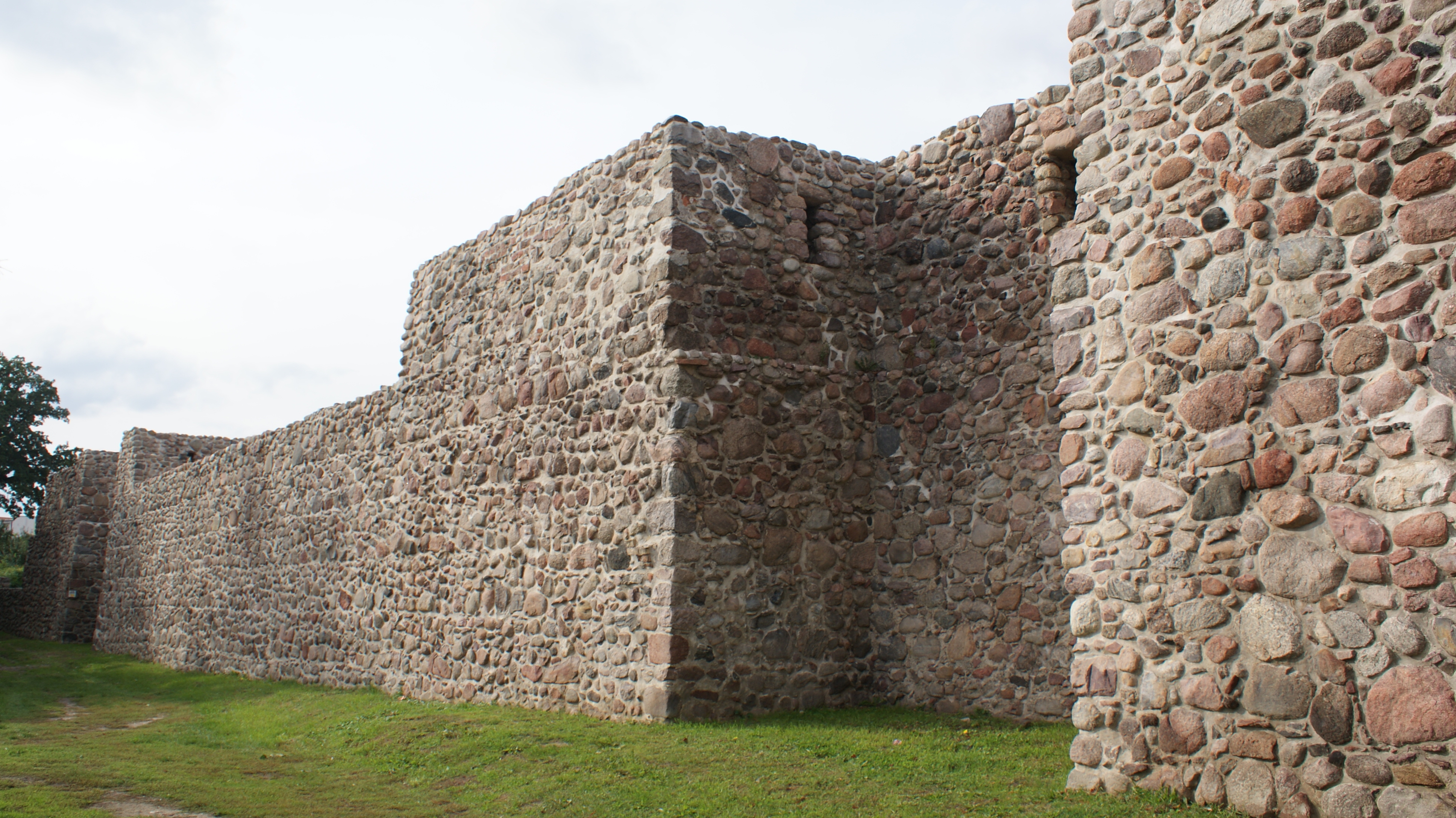
Medieval town walls

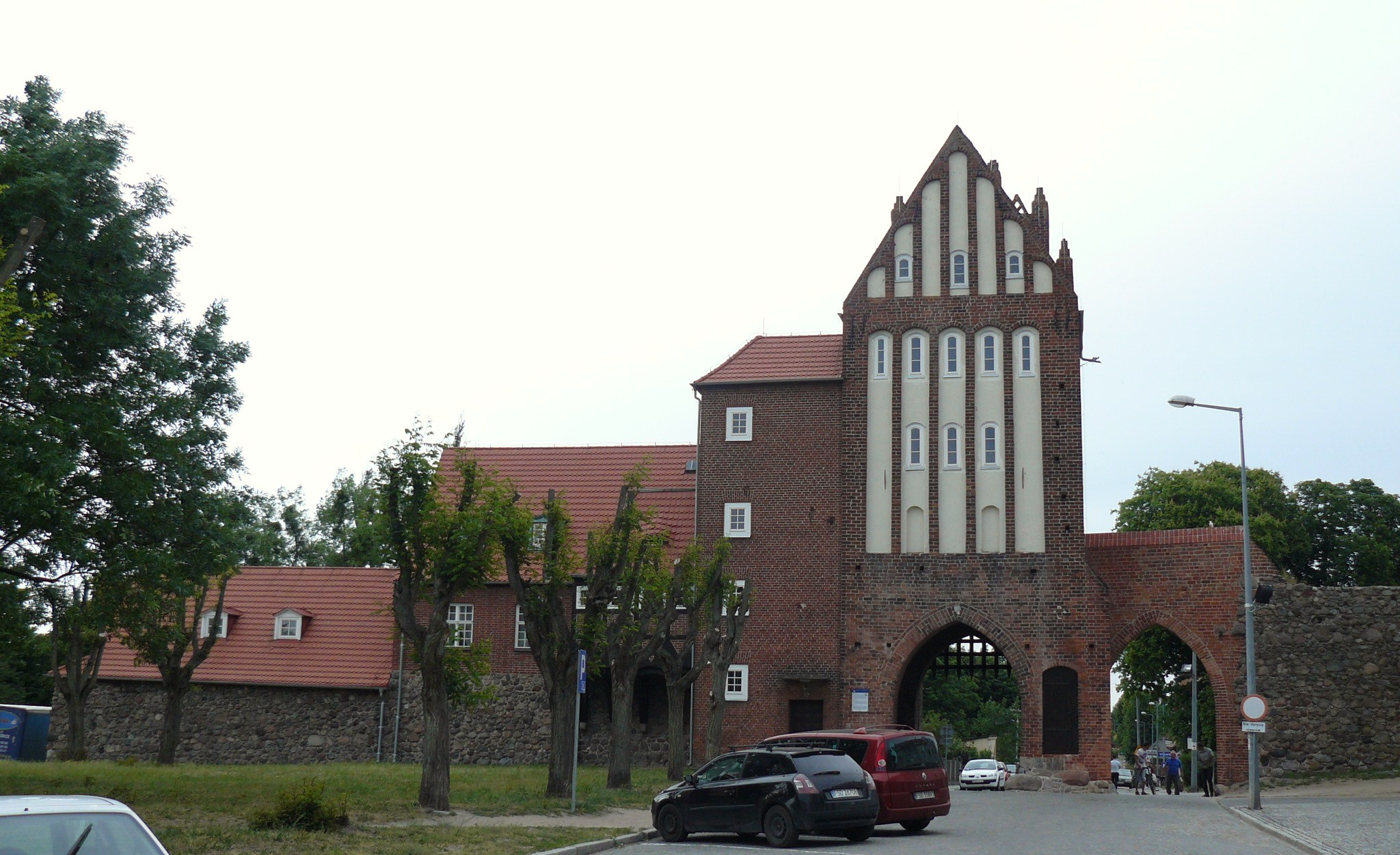
Mill Gate (Brama Młyńska)

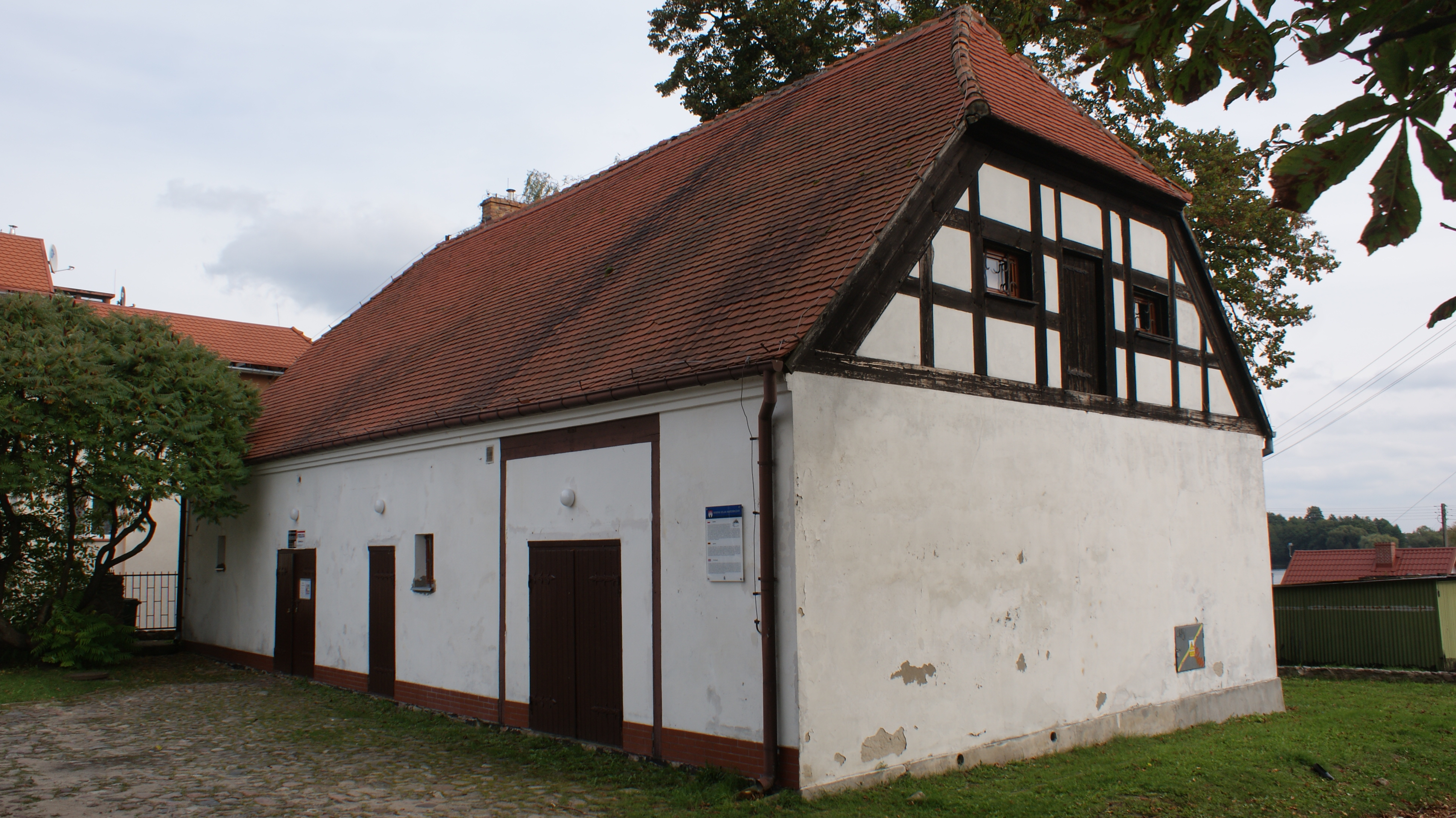
Old granary from 1764

== Demographics ==
Historical population

Year	Pop.	±%
1871	5,800	—
1880	6,381	+10.0%
1890	6,431	+0.8%
1900	6,056	−5.8%
1910	5,460	−9.8%

Year	Pop.	±%
1925	5,374	−1.6%
1939	5,918	+10.1%
1950	2,679	−54.7%
1960	4,338	+61.9%
2010	10,188	+134.9%

== Sports ==
The local football club is Łucznik Strzelce Krajeńskie. It competes in the lower leagues.

The Polish Cyclo-cross Championships were held in Strzelce Krajeńskie in 1984, 1994, 2004 and 2019.

== Notable people ==
- Bruno Schulz (1865–1932), German architect
- Wilhelm Uhde (1874–1947), German art collector

== Twin towns – sister cities ==
See twin towns of Gmina Strzelce Krajeńskie.
