= Goszczanówko =

- Village
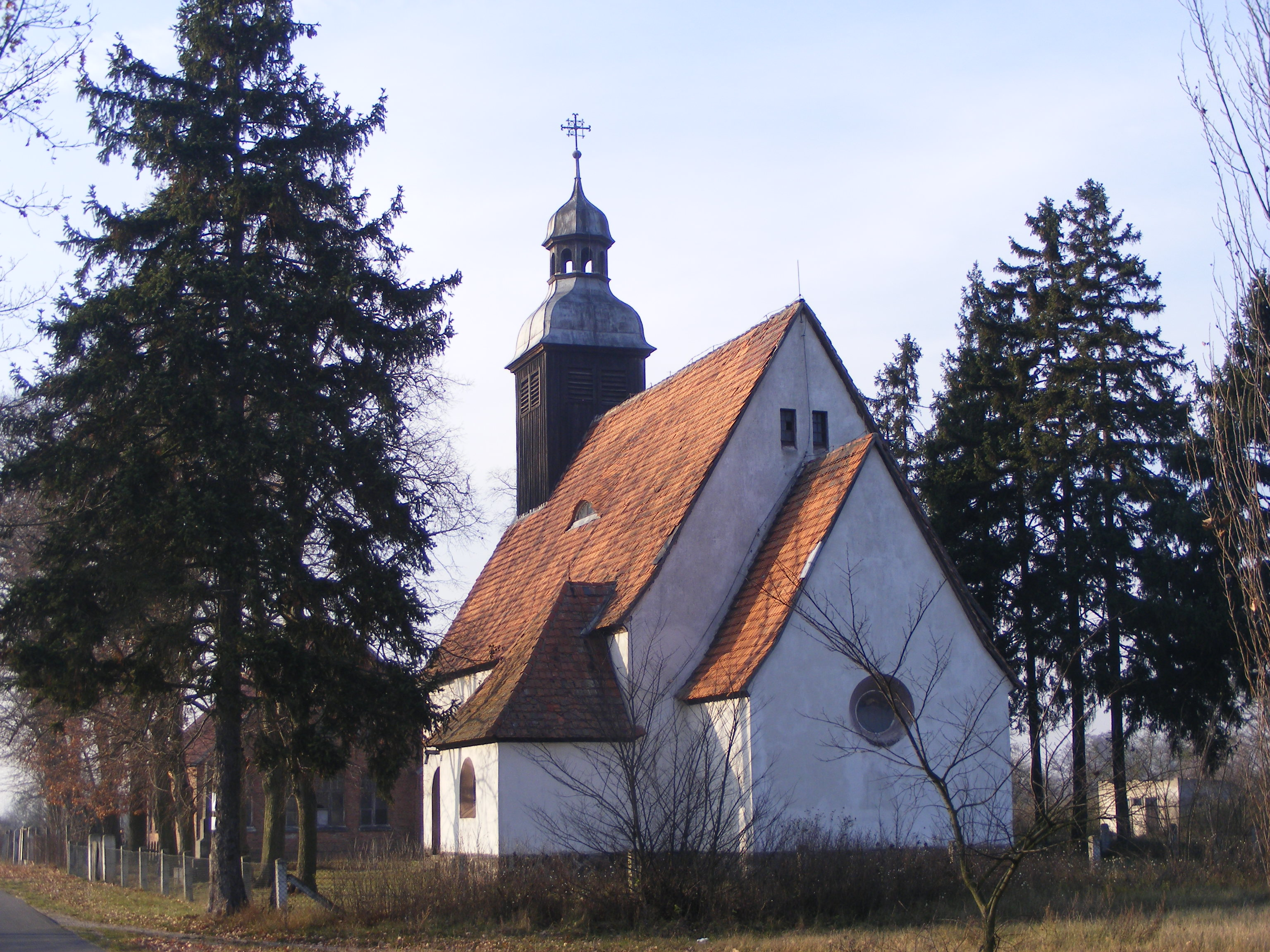
- Catholic church

- Location within Poland
- Coordinates: 52°45′N 15°36′E
- Country: Poland
- Voivodeship: Lubusz
- County: Strzelce-Drezdenko
- Gmina: Drezdenko
- Population: 140

Goszczanówko [ɡɔʂt͡ʂaˈnufkɔ] is a village in the administrative district of Gmina Drezdenko, within Strzelce-Drezdenko County, Lubusz Voivodeship, in western Poland.
