= Trzebicz Nowy =

- Village
- Location within Poland
- Coordinates: 52°50′N 15°50′E
- Country: Poland
- Voivodeship: Lubusz
- County: Strzelce-Drezdenko
- Gmina: Drezdenko

Trzebicz Nowy [ˈtʂɛbit͡ʂ ˈnɔvɨ] is a village in the administrative district of Gmina Drezdenko, within Strzelce-Drezdenko County, Lubusz Voivodeship, in western Poland.
