= Trzebicz, Lubusz Voivodeship =

Trzebicz
- Village
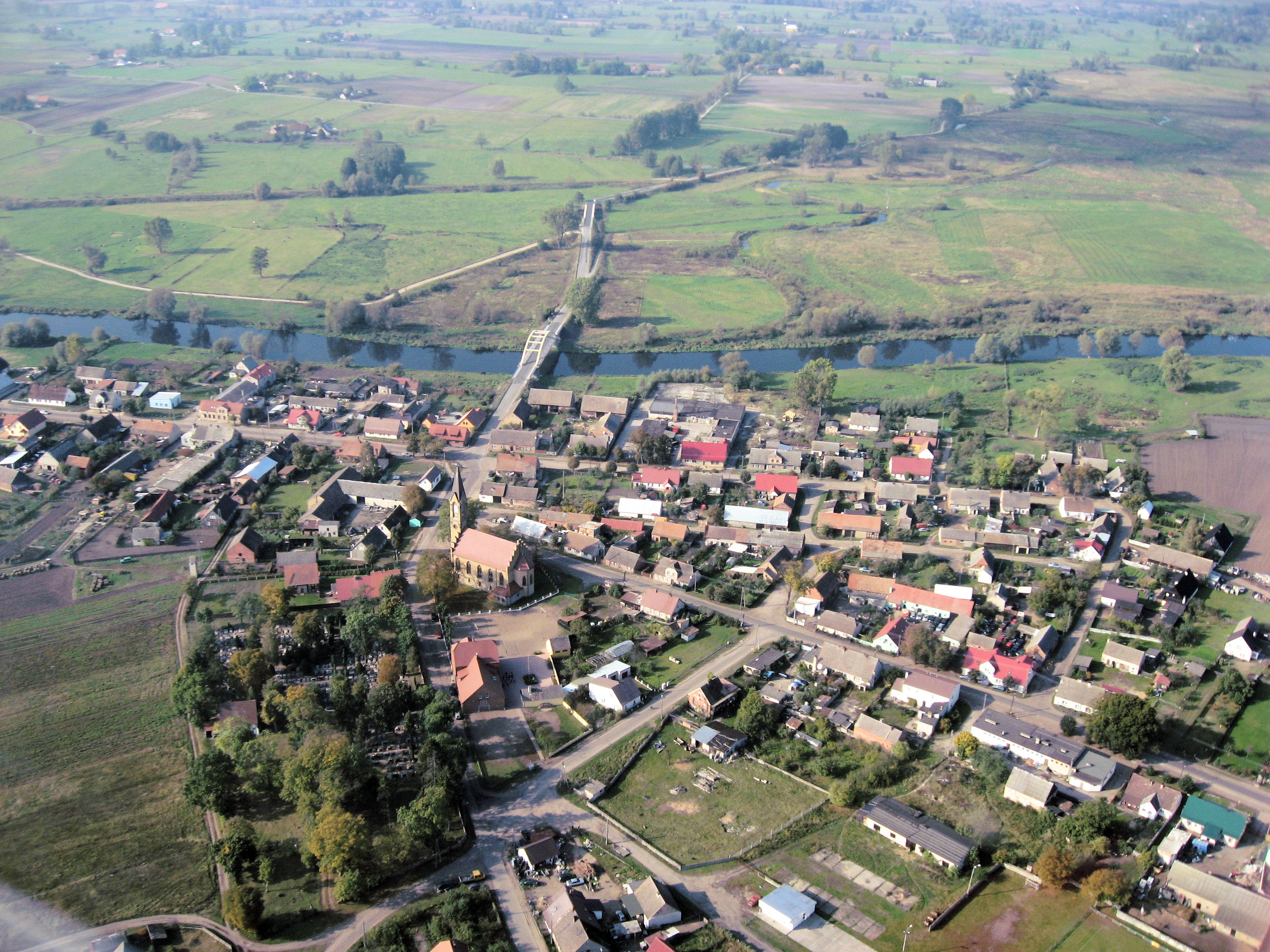
- Aerial view

- Location within Poland
- Coordinates: 52°49′N 15°45′E
- Country: Poland
- Voivodeship: Lubusz
- County: Strzelce-Drezdenko
- Gmina: Drezdenko

Population (2009)
  - Total: 734
- Time zone: UTC+1 (CET)
  - Summer (DST): UTC+2 (CEST)
- Vehicle registration: FSD

Trzebicz [ˈtʂɛbit͡ʂ] (German: Trebitsch) is a village in the administrative district of Gmina Drezdenko, within Strzelce-Drezdenko County, Lubusz Voivodeship, in western Poland.

The village had a population of 734 in 2009.

== History ==
During World War II, the Germans enslaved Poles, Frenchmen and Russians as forced labour in the village. On August 11, 1942, the Gestapo carried out a public execution of a 24-year-old Polish man, accused of raping a German girl.

== Sports ==
The local football club is Uran Trzebicz. It competes in the lower leagues.
