= Owczarki =

Owczarki may refer to the following places:

- Owczarki, Lubusz Voivodeship (west Poland)
- Owczarki, Pomeranian Voivodeship (north Poland)
- Owczarki, Warmian-Masurian Voivodeship (north Poland)
