= Żółwin =

Żółwin may refer to the following places:

- Żółwin, Międzyrzecz County in Lubusz Voivodeship (west Poland)
- Żółwin, Strzelce-Drezdenko County in Lubusz Voivodeship (west Poland)
- Żółwin, Masovian Voivodeship (east-central Poland)
