= Sarbiewo =

Sarbiewo may refer to the following places in Poland:

- Sarbiewo, Lubusz Voivodeship
- Sarbiewo, Masovian Voivodeship
