= Sierosławice, Lubusz Voivodeship =

Sierosławice
- Village
- Location within Poland
- Coordinates: 52°50′03″N 15°34′52″E
- Country: Poland
- Voivodeship: Lubusz
- County: Strzelce-Drezdenko
- Gmina: Zwierzyn

Sierosławice [ɕɛrɔswaˈvit͡sɛ] is a village in the administrative district of Gmina Zwierzyn, within Strzelce-Drezdenko County, Lubusz Voivodeship, in western Poland.
