= Górczyna, Strzelce-Drezdenko County =

Górczyna
- Village
- Location within Poland
- Coordinates: 52°46′55″N 15°33′22″E
- Country: Poland
- Voivodeship: Lubusz
- County: Strzelce-Drezdenko
- Gmina: Zwierzyn

Górczyna [ɡurˈt͡ʂɨna] is a village in the administrative district of Gmina Zwierzyn, within Strzelce-Drezdenko County, Lubusz Voivodeship, in western Poland.
