= Błotno, Lubusz Voivodeship =

Błotno
- Village
- Location within Poland
- Coordinates: 52°47′35″N 15°40′27″E
- Country: Poland
- Voivodeship: Lubusz
- County: Strzelce-Drezdenko
- Gmina: Zwierzyn

Błotno [ˈbwɔtnɔ] is a village in the administrative district of Gmina Zwierzyn, within Strzelce-Drezdenko County, Lubusz Voivodeship, in western Poland.
