= Gościmiec =

- Village
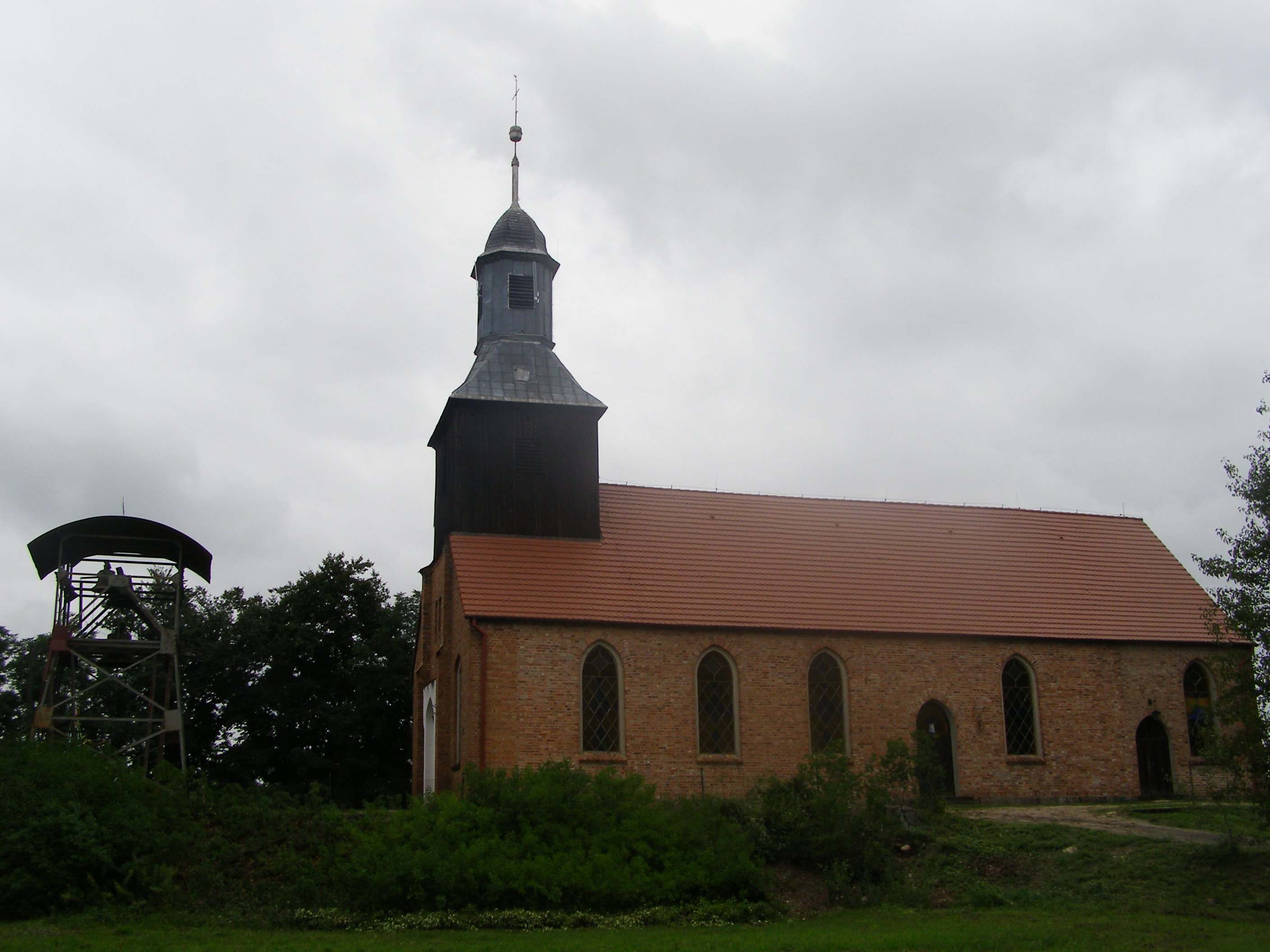
- Church of the Nativity of the Virgin Mary in Gościmiec

- Location within Poland
- Coordinates: 52°47′34″N 15°39′14″E
- Country: Poland
- Voivodeship: Lubusz
- County: Strzelce-Drezdenko
- Gmina: Zwierzyn
- Time zone: UTC+1 (CET)
  - Summer (DST): UTC+2 (CEST)
- Vehicle registration: FSD

Gościmiec (Polish: [ɡɔɕˈt͡ɕimjɛt͡s]) is a village in the administrative district of Gmina Zwierzyn, within Strzelce-Drezdenko County, Lubusz Voivodeship, in western Poland.

== History ==
During World War II, the Germans enslaved Poles as forced labour in the village, and one Polish man was publicly executed by the Gestapo.
