= Nowe Drezdenko railway station =

Railway station in Drezdenko, Poland

Coordinates: 52.8537°N 15.8337°E

Nowe Drezdenko
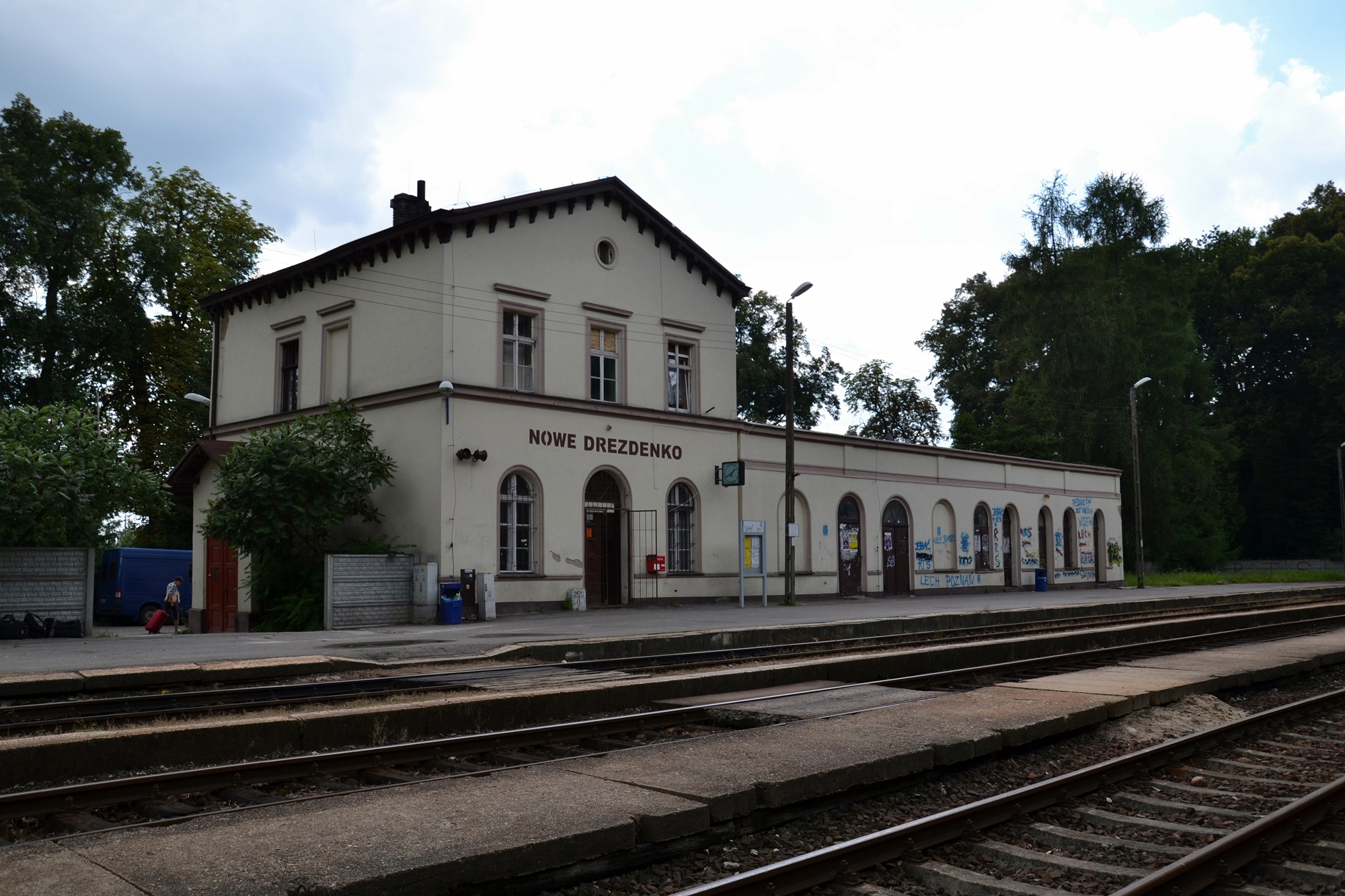
- Nowe Drezdenko railway station

General information
- Location: Drezdenko, Lubusz Voivodeship; Poland
- System: Railway Station
- Operator: PKP; Polregio; Arriva
- Line: 203: Tczew–Kostrzyn railway
- Platforms: 3
- Tracks: 5

History
- Opened: 1857; 169 years ago
- Former names: Driesen (Vordamm) 1857-1900; Driesen Vordamm 1901-45; Drezdenko Północne 1945-46

Services
Preceding station	PKP Intercity	Following station
Krzyż towards Gdynia Główna	TLK	Strzelce Krajeńskie Wschód towards Kostrzyn
Preceding station	Polregio	Following station
Stare Kurowo towards Kostrzyn	PR	Stare Bielice towards Poznań Główny
Location
- Location within Poland

Nowe Drezdenko railway station is a railway station serving the towns of Drezdenko and Strzelce Krajeńskie, in the Lubusz Voivodeship, Poland. The station opened in 1857 and is located on the Tczew–Kostrzyn railway. The train services are operated by PKP, Polregio and Arriva.

== Train services ==
The station is served by the following service(s):

- Intercity services Gorzow Wielkopolski - Krzyz - Pila - Bydgoszcz - Torun - Kutno - Lowicz - Warsaw
- Intercity services Gorzow Wielkopolski - Krzyz - Poznan - Ostrow Wielkopolski - Lubliniec - Czestochowa - Krakow
- Intercity services (TLK) Gdynia Główna — Kostrzyn
- Regional services (R) Kostrzyn - Gorzow Wielkopolski - Krzyz (- Poznan)
