= Rzekcin =

- Village
- Location within Poland
- Coordinates: 52°49′N 15°37′E
- Country: Poland
- Voivodeship: Lubusz
- County: Strzelce-Drezdenko
- Gmina: Zwierzyn

Rzekcin [ˈʐɛkt͡ɕin] is a village in the administrative district of Gmina Zwierzyn, within Strzelce-Drezdenko County, Lubusz Voivodeship, in western Poland.
