= Gmina Zwierzyn =

Gmina Zwierzyn Zwierzyn Commune
- Gmina
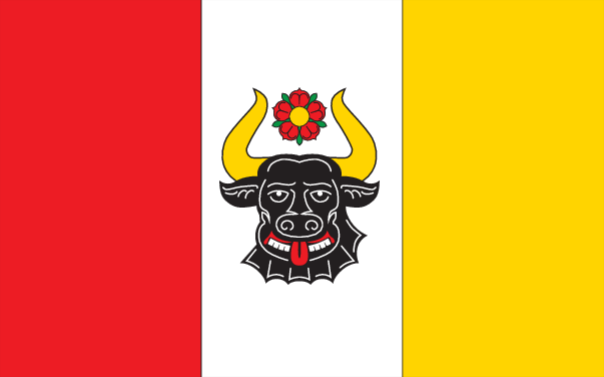
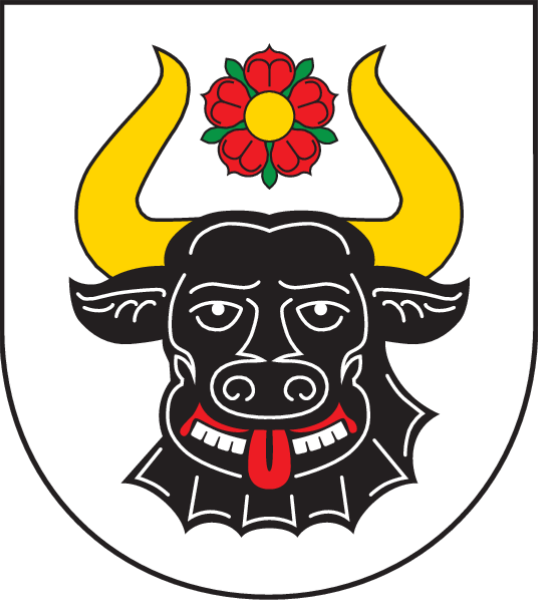
- Flag Coat of arms
- Interactive map of Gmina Zwierzyn
- Coordinates (Zwierzyn): 52°50′N 15°34′E
- Country: Poland
- Voivodeship: Lubusz
- County: Strzelce-Drezdenko
- Seat: Zwierzyn

Area
  - Total: 100.98 km^{2} (38.99 sq mi)

Population (2019-06-30)
  - Total: 4,335
  - Density: 42.93/km^{2} (111.2/sq mi)
- Website: https://www.zwierzyn.pl

Gmina Zwierzyn is a rural gmina (administrative district) in Strzelce-Drezdenko County, Lubusz Voivodeship, in western Poland. Its seat is the village of Zwierzyn, which lies approximately 6 kilometres (4 mi) south-east of Strzelce Krajeńskie and 25 km (16 mi) north-east of Gorzów Wielkopolski.

The gmina covers an area of 100.98 square kilometres (39.0 sq mi), and as of 2019 its total population is 4,335.

== Villages ==
Gmina Zwierzyn contains the villages and settlements of Błotno, Brzezinka, Górczyna, Górecko, Górki, Gościmiec, Owczarki, Pełczyna, Przysieka, Rzekcin, Sarbiewo, Sierosławice, Zagaje, Żółwin and Zwierzyn.

== Neighbouring gminas ==
Gmina Zwierzyn is bordered by the gminas of Drezdenko, Santok, Stare Kurowo and Strzelce Krajeńskie.

== Twin towns – sister cities ==
Gmina Zwierzyn is twinned with:

- Rehfelde, Germany
