= Górki, Strzelce-Drezdenko County =

Górki
- Village
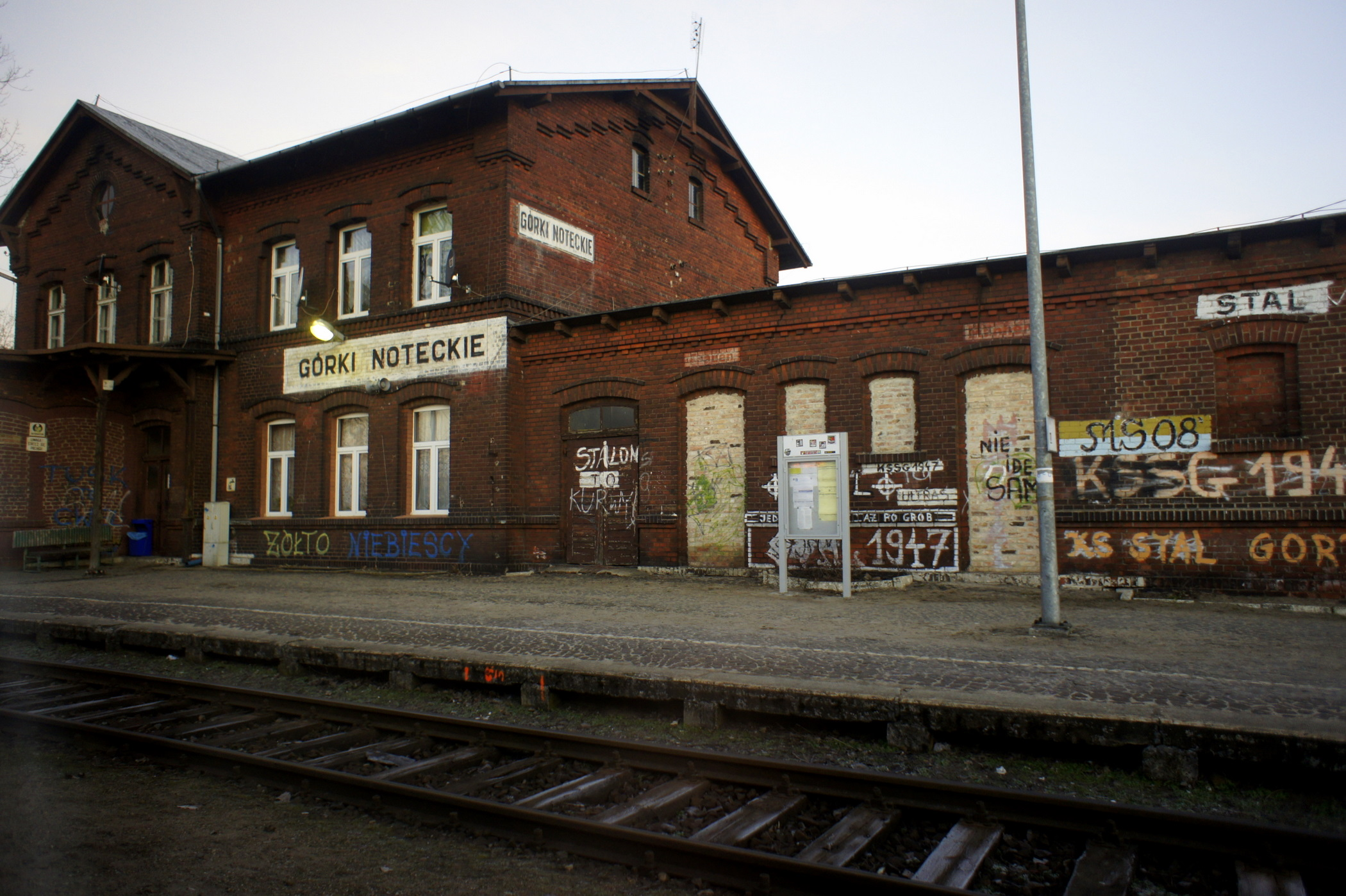
- Railway station

- Location within Poland
- Coordinates: 52°47′08″N 15°29′58″E
- Country: Poland
- Voivodeship: Lubusz
- County: Strzelce-Drezdenko
- Gmina: Zwierzyn
- Population: 980

Górki [ˈɡurki] is a village in the administrative district of Gmina Zwierzyn, within Strzelce-Drezdenko County, Lubusz Voivodeship, in western Poland.
