= Przysieka, Lubusz Voivodeship =

Przysieka
- Village
- Location within Poland
- Coordinates: 52°47′52″N 15°31′43″E
- Country: Poland
- Voivodeship: Lubusz
- County: Strzelce-Drezdenko
- Gmina: Zwierzyn
- Population: 240

Przysieka [pʂɨˈɕɛka] is a village in the administrative district of Gmina Zwierzyn, within Strzelce-Drezdenko County, Lubusz Voivodeship, in western Poland.
