= Zwierzyn, Lubusz Voivodeship =

Zwierzyn
- Village
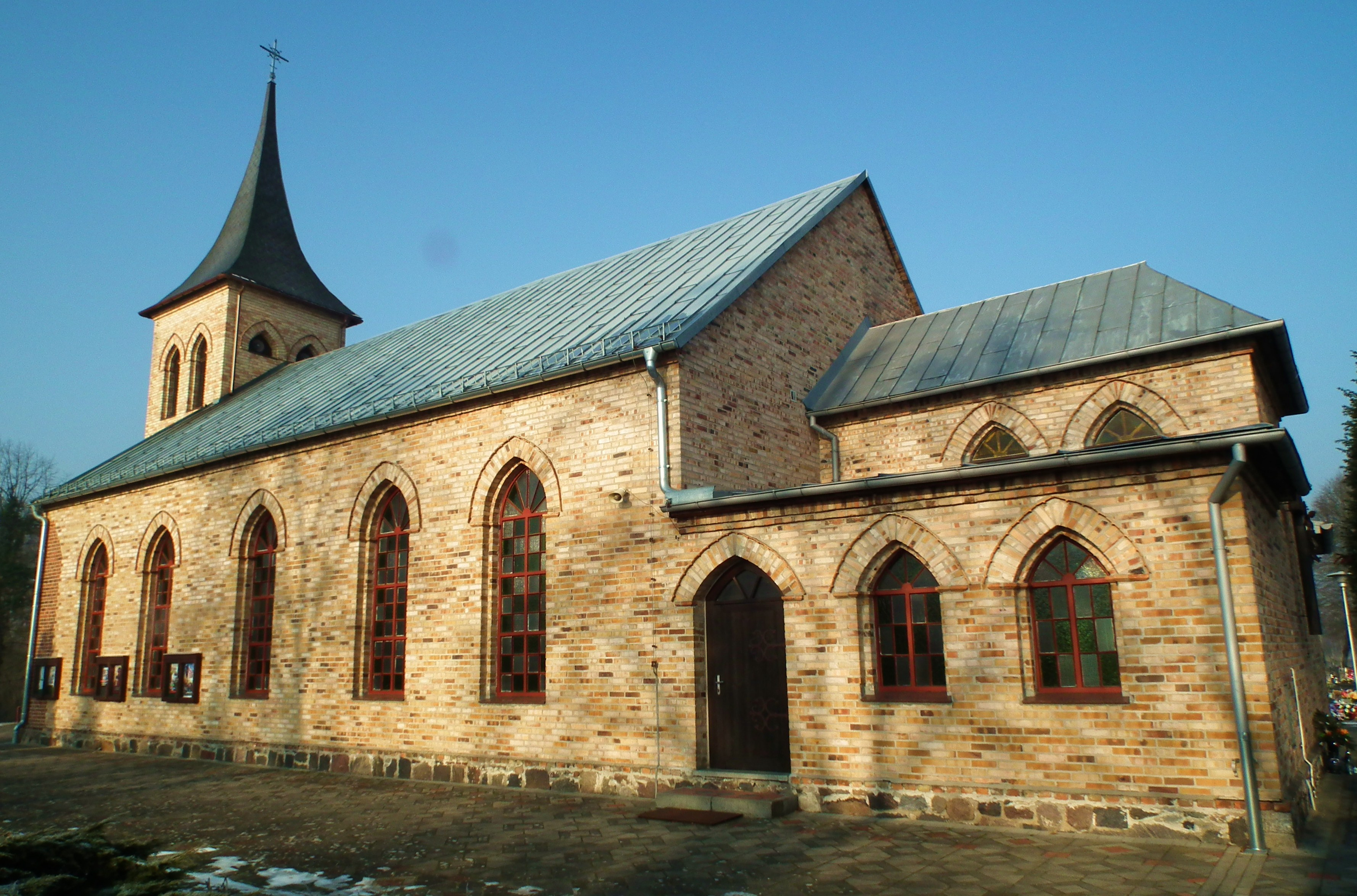
- Church of Saint John

- Coat of arms

- Location within Poland
- Coordinates: 52°50′N 15°34′E
- Country: Poland
- Voivodeship: Lubusz
- County: Strzelce-Drezdenko
- Gmina: Zwierzyn

Population
  - Total: 1,300
- Time zone: UTC+1 (CET)
  - Summer (DST): UTC+2 (CEST)
- Vehicle registration: FSD
- Website: http://www.zwierzyn.pl/

Zwierzyn [ˈzvjɛʐɨn] (German: Neu Mecklenburg) is a village in Strzelce-Drezdenko County, Lubusz Voivodeship, in western Poland. It is the head of the gmina (administrative district) called Gmina Zwierzyn.

According to Narodowy Instytut Dziedzictwa (governmental institution responsible for the objects considered most important to the nation's cultural heritage) there is one heritage monument in Zwierzyn, the Church of Saint John the Baptist, which was built in 1767.

== History ==
During World War II, the Germans enslaved Poles as forced labour in the village. On May 19, 1941, the Germans carried out a public execution of a 25-year-old Polish man.

In 2015 a new railway station was erected in Zwierzyn.

== Transport ==
Zwierzyn is located at the intersection of voivodeship roads 156 and 157, and there is also a railway station.

== Sports ==
The local football club is Pionier Zwierzyn. It competes in the lower leagues.

== Notable people ==
- Zenon Plech (1953–2020), Polish speedway rider
