= Zagaje, Strzelce-Drezdenko County =

Zagaje
- Village
- Location within Poland
- Coordinates: 52°49′09″N 15°36′38″E
- Country: Poland
- Voivodeship: Lubusz
- County: Strzelce-Drezdenko
- Gmina: Zwierzyn

Zagaje [zaˈɡajɛ] is a village in the administrative district of Gmina Zwierzyn, within Strzelce-Drezdenko County, Lubusz Voivodeship, in western Poland.
