= Zwierzyn railway station =

Railway station in Zwierzyn, Poland

Coordinates: 52.8367°N 15.5844°E

Zwierzyn
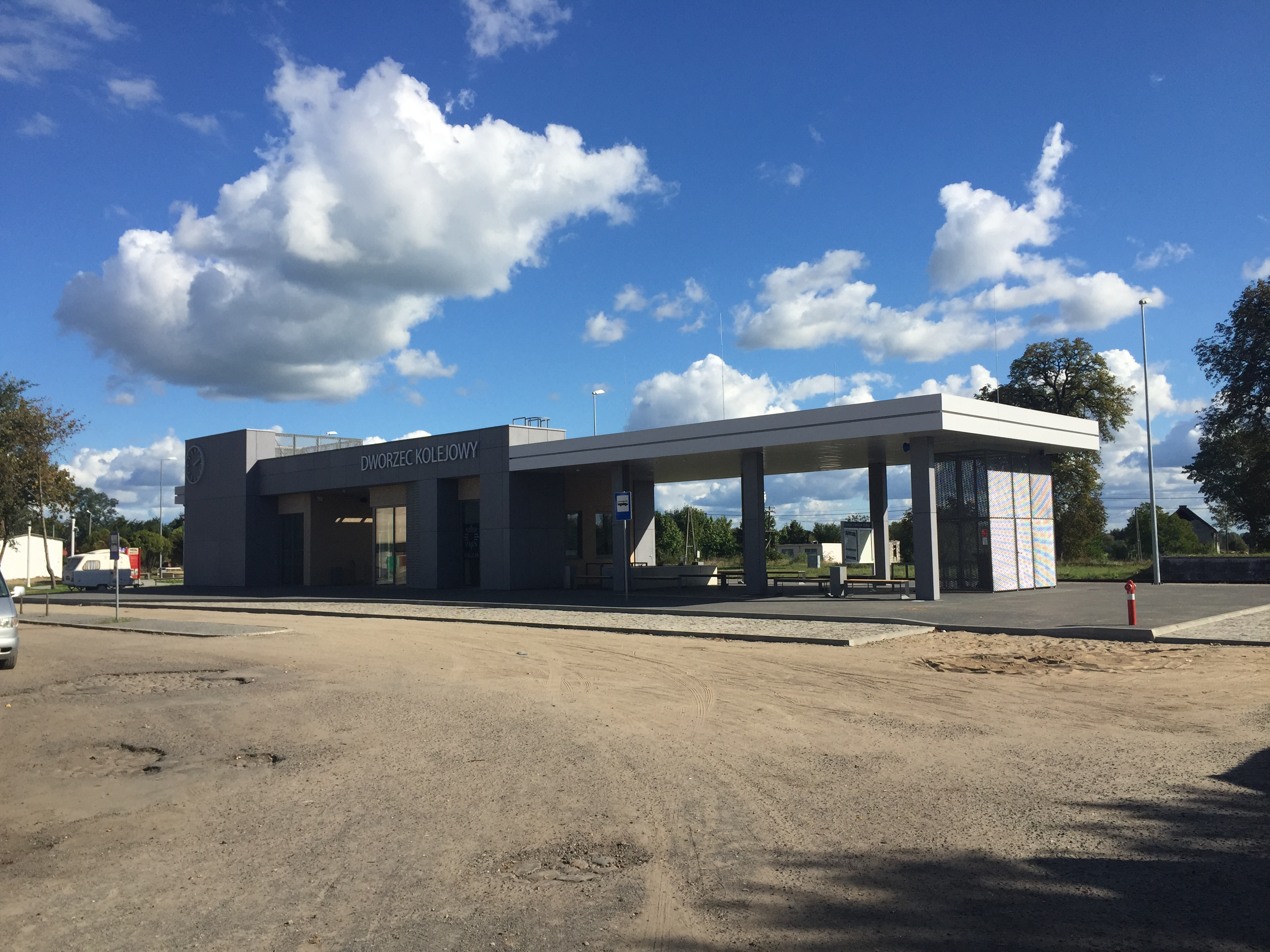
- Zwierzyn railway station

General information
- Location: Zwierzyn, Lubusz Voivodeship; Poland
- System: Railway Station
- Operator: PKP; Polregio; Arriva
- Lines: 203: Tczew–Kostrzyn railway 426: Strzelce Krajeńskie Wschód–Strzelce Krajeńskie railway (closed)

History
- Former names: Friedeberg Ostbahnhof; Friedeberg (Neumark); Strzelce Krajeńskie Wschód

Services
Preceding station	PKP Intercity	Following station
Nowe Drezdenko towards Gdynia Główna	TLK	Gorzów Wielkopolski Wschodni towards Kostrzyn
Preceding station	Polregio	Following station
Sarbiewo towards Kostrzyn	PR	Stare Kurowo towards Poznań Główny
Location
- Location within Poland

Zwierzyn railway station (until 2024 Strzelce Krajeńskie Wschód railway station) is a railway station serving the towns of Zwierzyn and Strzelce Krajeńskie, in the Lubusz Voivodeship, Poland. The station is located on the Tczew–Kostrzyn railway and the now closed Strzelce Krajeńskie Wschód–Strzelce Krajeńskie railway. The train services are operated by PKP, Polregio, and Arriva.

== Train services ==
The station is served by the following service(s):

- Intercity services Gorzow Wielkopolski - Krzyz - Pila - Bydgoszcz - Torun - Kutno - Lowicz - Warsaw
- Intercity services Gorzow Wielkopolski - Krzyz - Poznan - Ostrow Wielkopolski - Lubliniec - Czestochowa - Krakow
- Intercity services (TLK) Gdynia Główna — Kostrzyn
- Regional services (R) Kostrzyn - Gorzow Wielkopolski - Krzyz (- Poznan)
