= Pełczyna =

- Settlement
- Location within Poland
- Coordinates: 52°48′27″N 15°29′23″E
- Country: Poland
- Voivodeship: Lubusz
- County: Strzelce-Drezdenko
- Gmina: Zwierzyn

Pełczyna [pɛu̯ˈt͡ʂɨna] is a settlement in the administrative district of Gmina Zwierzyn, within Strzelce-Drezdenko County, Lubusz Voivodeship, in western Poland.
