= Górecko =

- Village
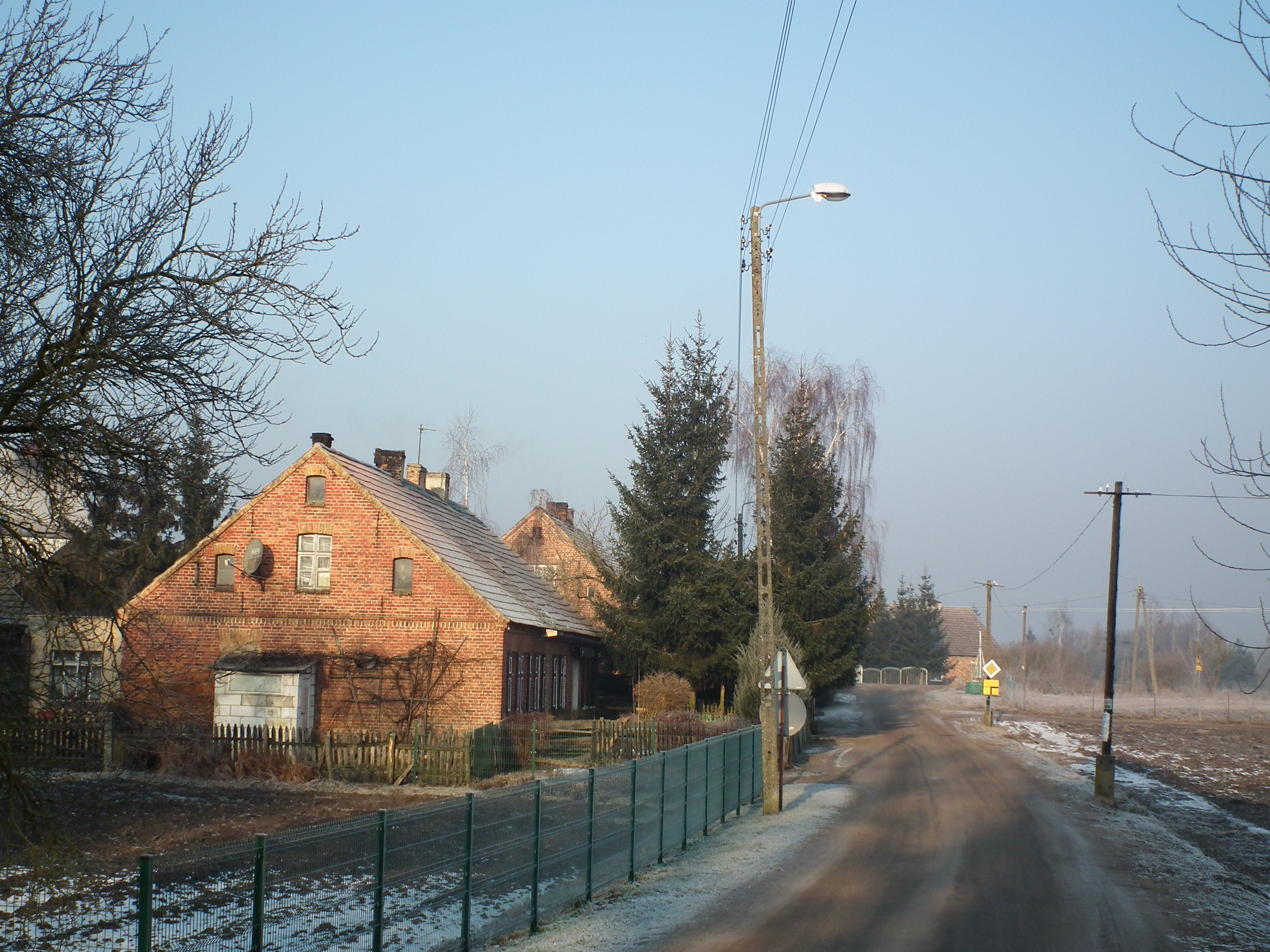

- Location within Poland
- Coordinates: 52°47′N 15°34′E
- Country: Poland
- Voivodeship: Lubusz
- County: Strzelce-Drezdenko
- Gmina: Zwierzyn

Górecko [ɡuˈrɛt͡skɔ] is a village in the administrative district of Gmina Zwierzyn, within Strzelce-Drezdenko County, Lubusz Voivodeship, in western Poland.
