= Brzezinka, Strzelce-Drezdenko County =

Brzezinka
- Village
- Location within Poland
- Coordinates: 52°45′59″N 15°28′55″E
- Country: Poland
- Voivodeship: Lubusz
- County: Strzelce-Drezdenko
- Gmina: Zwierzyn
- Time zone: UTC+1 (CET)
  - Summer (DST): UTC+2 (CEST)
- Vehicle registration: FSD

Brzezinka Polish pronunciation: [bʐɛˈʑiŋka] is a village in the administrative district of Gmina Zwierzyn, within Strzelce-Drezdenko County, Lubusz Voivodeship, in western Poland.
