= Sarbiewo, Lubusz Voivodeship =

Sarbiewo
- Village
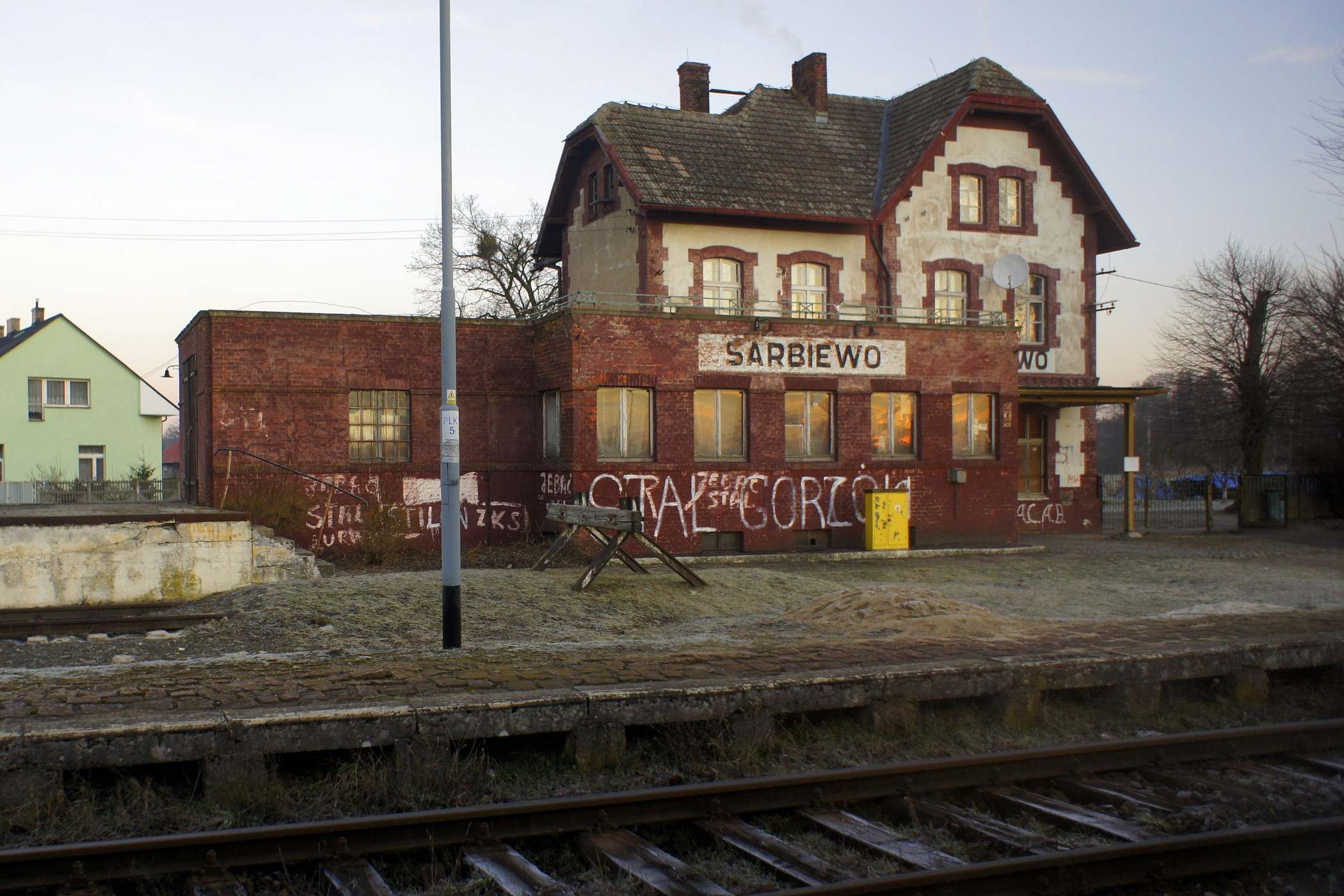
- Railway station

- Location within Poland
- Coordinates: 52°50′N 15°32′E
- Country: Poland
- Voivodeship: Lubusz
- County: Strzelce-Drezdenko
- Gmina: Zwierzyn

Sarbiewo [sarˈbjɛvɔ] (German: Mückenburg) is a village in the administrative district of Gmina Zwierzyn, within Strzelce-Drezdenko County, Lubusz Voivodeship, in western Poland.
