= Owczarki, Lubusz Voivodeship =

Owczarki
- Settlement
- Location within Poland
- Coordinates: 52°50′47″N 15°33′23″E
- Country: Poland
- Voivodeship: Lubusz
- County: Strzelce-Drezdenko
- Gmina: Zwierzyn

Owczarki [ɔfˈt͡ʂarki] is a settlement in the administrative district of Gmina Zwierzyn, within Strzelce-Drezdenko County, Lubusz Voivodeship, in western Poland.
