= Żółwin, Strzelce-Drezdenko County =

Żółwin
- Village
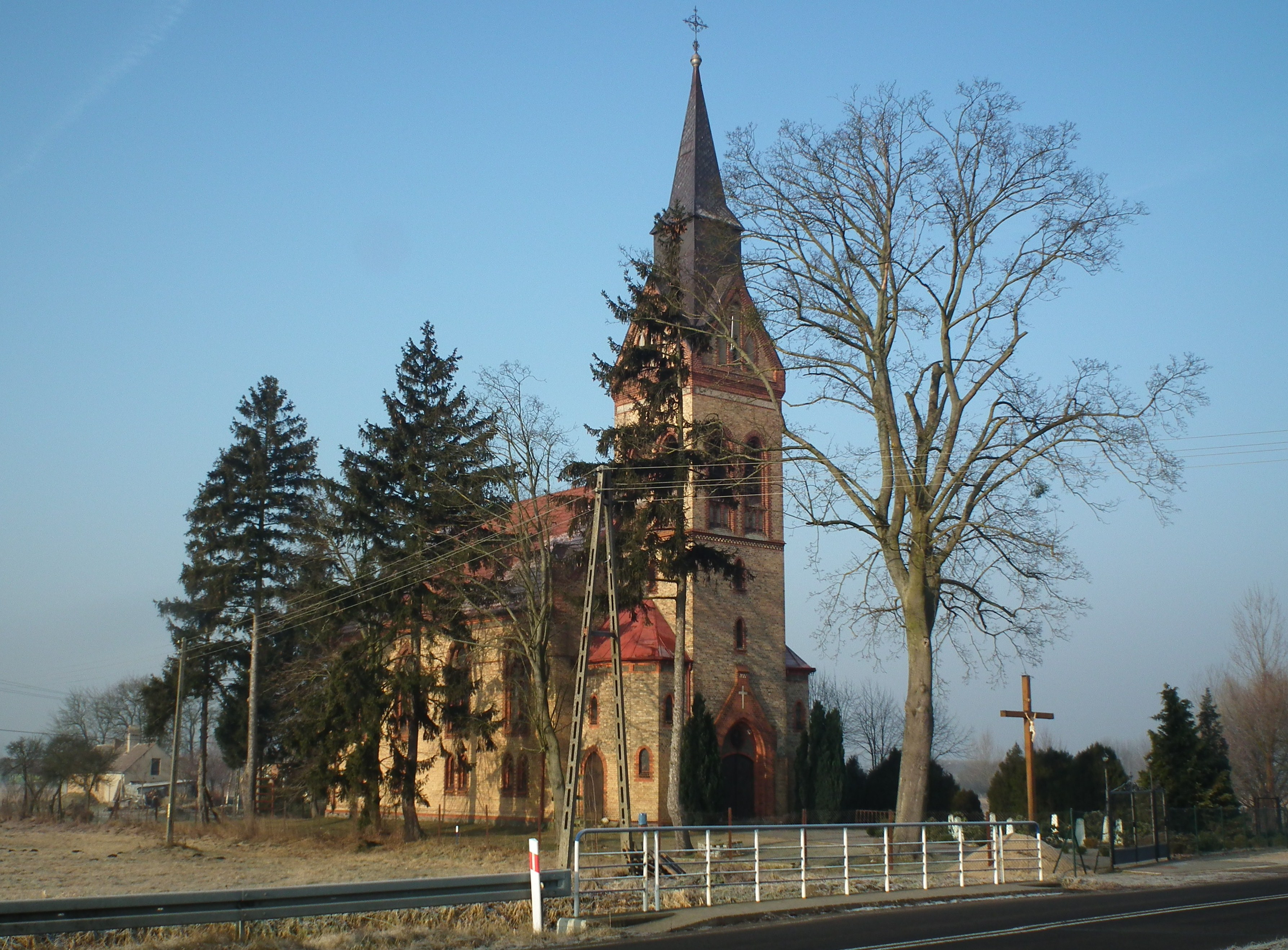
- Catholic church

- Location within Poland
- Coordinates: 52°48′57″N 15°38′28″E
- Country: Poland
- Voivodeship: Lubusz
- County: Strzelce-Drezdenko
- Gmina: Zwierzyn

Żółwin [ˈʐuu̯vin] is a village in the administrative district of Gmina Zwierzyn, within Strzelce-Drezdenko County, Lubusz Voivodeship, in western Poland.

== History ==
German sources report that the village people were deported from their homes in July 1945 by the new Polish administration.
